

502001–502100 

|-bgcolor=#d6d6d6
| 502001 ||  || — || April 27, 2011 || Haleakala || Pan-STARRS ||  || align=right | 3.0 km || 
|-id=002 bgcolor=#fefefe
| 502002 ||  || — || August 28, 2013 || Mount Lemmon || Mount Lemmon Survey ||  || align=right data-sort-value="0.84" | 840 m || 
|-id=003 bgcolor=#d6d6d6
| 502003 ||  || — || March 8, 2005 || Kitt Peak || Spacewatch ||  || align=right | 2.3 km || 
|-id=004 bgcolor=#fefefe
| 502004 ||  || — || January 5, 2000 || Kitt Peak || Spacewatch || SUL || align=right data-sort-value="0.78" | 780 m || 
|-id=005 bgcolor=#fefefe
| 502005 ||  || — || April 21, 2004 || Kitt Peak || Spacewatch ||  || align=right data-sort-value="0.81" | 810 m || 
|-id=006 bgcolor=#fefefe
| 502006 ||  || — || August 18, 2006 || Kitt Peak || Spacewatch || MAS || align=right data-sort-value="0.64" | 640 m || 
|-id=007 bgcolor=#E9E9E9
| 502007 ||  || — || February 12, 1999 || Kitt Peak || Spacewatch ||  || align=right | 1.3 km || 
|-id=008 bgcolor=#E9E9E9
| 502008 ||  || — || August 15, 2013 || Haleakala || Pan-STARRS ||  || align=right data-sort-value="0.81" | 810 m || 
|-id=009 bgcolor=#E9E9E9
| 502009 ||  || — || December 1, 2005 || Kitt Peak || Spacewatch ||  || align=right | 1.8 km || 
|-id=010 bgcolor=#E9E9E9
| 502010 ||  || — || January 22, 2006 || Mount Lemmon || Mount Lemmon Survey || WIT || align=right | 2.0 km || 
|-id=011 bgcolor=#E9E9E9
| 502011 ||  || — || January 12, 2011 || Mount Lemmon || Mount Lemmon Survey ||  || align=right data-sort-value="0.67" | 670 m || 
|-id=012 bgcolor=#E9E9E9
| 502012 ||  || — || January 30, 2011 || Haleakala || Pan-STARRS || NEM || align=right | 1.7 km || 
|-id=013 bgcolor=#d6d6d6
| 502013 ||  || — || January 12, 2010 || Kitt Peak || Spacewatch ||  || align=right | 2.9 km || 
|-id=014 bgcolor=#E9E9E9
| 502014 ||  || — || December 15, 2014 || Kitt Peak || Spacewatch ||  || align=right | 2.0 km || 
|-id=015 bgcolor=#E9E9E9
| 502015 ||  || — || November 26, 2014 || Haleakala || Pan-STARRS ||  || align=right | 2.0 km || 
|-id=016 bgcolor=#E9E9E9
| 502016 ||  || — || January 30, 2011 || Mount Lemmon || Mount Lemmon Survey || MAR || align=right | 1.8 km || 
|-id=017 bgcolor=#E9E9E9
| 502017 ||  || — || December 25, 2005 || Kitt Peak || Spacewatch || NEM || align=right | 1.7 km || 
|-id=018 bgcolor=#fefefe
| 502018 ||  || — || August 27, 2013 || Haleakala || Pan-STARRS ||  || align=right data-sort-value="0.71" | 710 m || 
|-id=019 bgcolor=#fefefe
| 502019 ||  || — || December 13, 2010 || Mount Lemmon || Mount Lemmon Survey ||  || align=right data-sort-value="0.87" | 870 m || 
|-id=020 bgcolor=#E9E9E9
| 502020 ||  || — || December 12, 2010 || Mount Lemmon || Mount Lemmon Survey ||  || align=right | 1.3 km || 
|-id=021 bgcolor=#E9E9E9
| 502021 ||  || — || November 8, 2009 || Mount Lemmon || Mount Lemmon Survey ||  || align=right | 1.2 km || 
|-id=022 bgcolor=#E9E9E9
| 502022 ||  || — || October 5, 2013 || Mount Lemmon || Mount Lemmon Survey ||  || align=right | 1.4 km || 
|-id=023 bgcolor=#fefefe
| 502023 ||  || — || February 28, 2008 || Mount Lemmon || Mount Lemmon Survey ||  || align=right data-sort-value="0.59" | 590 m || 
|-id=024 bgcolor=#E9E9E9
| 502024 ||  || — || April 27, 2012 || Haleakala || Pan-STARRS ||  || align=right | 1.4 km || 
|-id=025 bgcolor=#d6d6d6
| 502025 ||  || — || April 24, 2010 || WISE || WISE ||  || align=right | 3.6 km || 
|-id=026 bgcolor=#E9E9E9
| 502026 ||  || — || January 28, 2011 || Mount Lemmon || Mount Lemmon Survey || HNS || align=right | 1.6 km || 
|-id=027 bgcolor=#E9E9E9
| 502027 ||  || — || December 21, 2014 || Mount Lemmon || Mount Lemmon Survey ||  || align=right | 1.5 km || 
|-id=028 bgcolor=#d6d6d6
| 502028 ||  || — || August 22, 2012 || Haleakala || Pan-STARRS || HYG || align=right | 2.7 km || 
|-id=029 bgcolor=#d6d6d6
| 502029 ||  || — || December 17, 2009 || Mount Lemmon || Mount Lemmon Survey ||  || align=right | 2.2 km || 
|-id=030 bgcolor=#E9E9E9
| 502030 ||  || — || January 22, 2006 || Mount Lemmon || Mount Lemmon Survey ||  || align=right | 2.7 km || 
|-id=031 bgcolor=#d6d6d6
| 502031 ||  || — || April 2, 2006 || Kitt Peak || Spacewatch ||  || align=right | 2.4 km || 
|-id=032 bgcolor=#E9E9E9
| 502032 ||  || — || November 9, 2009 || Mount Lemmon || Mount Lemmon Survey ||  || align=right | 2.2 km || 
|-id=033 bgcolor=#E9E9E9
| 502033 ||  || — || January 5, 2006 || Kitt Peak || Spacewatch ||  || align=right | 1.6 km || 
|-id=034 bgcolor=#fefefe
| 502034 ||  || — || September 4, 2010 || Mount Lemmon || Mount Lemmon Survey ||  || align=right data-sort-value="0.63" | 630 m || 
|-id=035 bgcolor=#E9E9E9
| 502035 ||  || — || May 15, 2012 || Haleakala || Pan-STARRS ||  || align=right | 1.0 km || 
|-id=036 bgcolor=#d6d6d6
| 502036 ||  || — || March 2, 2006 || Kitt Peak || Spacewatch || KOR || align=right | 2.0 km || 
|-id=037 bgcolor=#E9E9E9
| 502037 ||  || — || November 17, 2009 || Mount Lemmon || Mount Lemmon Survey ||  || align=right | 1.1 km || 
|-id=038 bgcolor=#E9E9E9
| 502038 ||  || — || January 30, 2011 || Haleakala || Pan-STARRS ||  || align=right | 1.8 km || 
|-id=039 bgcolor=#d6d6d6
| 502039 ||  || — || August 10, 2012 || Kitt Peak || Spacewatch ||  || align=right | 3.1 km || 
|-id=040 bgcolor=#E9E9E9
| 502040 ||  || — || January 7, 2006 || Mount Lemmon || Mount Lemmon Survey ||  || align=right | 1.9 km || 
|-id=041 bgcolor=#E9E9E9
| 502041 ||  || — || April 22, 2007 || Mount Lemmon || Mount Lemmon Survey ||  || align=right | 2.1 km || 
|-id=042 bgcolor=#E9E9E9
| 502042 ||  || — || January 8, 2006 || Mount Lemmon || Mount Lemmon Survey ||  || align=right | 1.9 km || 
|-id=043 bgcolor=#E9E9E9
| 502043 ||  || — || January 25, 2007 || Kitt Peak || Spacewatch ||  || align=right data-sort-value="0.94" | 940 m || 
|-id=044 bgcolor=#fefefe
| 502044 ||  || — || September 20, 2003 || Kitt Peak || Spacewatch ||  || align=right data-sort-value="0.69" | 690 m || 
|-id=045 bgcolor=#E9E9E9
| 502045 ||  || — || September 15, 2004 || Kitt Peak || Spacewatch ||  || align=right | 1.6 km || 
|-id=046 bgcolor=#E9E9E9
| 502046 ||  || — || December 5, 2005 || Mount Lemmon || Mount Lemmon Survey ||  || align=right | 1.7 km || 
|-id=047 bgcolor=#E9E9E9
| 502047 ||  || — || January 27, 2007 || Kitt Peak || Spacewatch ||  || align=right data-sort-value="0.98" | 980 m || 
|-id=048 bgcolor=#d6d6d6
| 502048 ||  || — || January 15, 2004 || Kitt Peak || Spacewatch ||  || align=right | 4.6 km || 
|-id=049 bgcolor=#E9E9E9
| 502049 ||  || — || January 30, 2011 || Haleakala || Pan-STARRS ||  || align=right data-sort-value="0.81" | 810 m || 
|-id=050 bgcolor=#E9E9E9
| 502050 ||  || — || January 30, 2011 || Haleakala || Pan-STARRS ||  || align=right | 1.2 km || 
|-id=051 bgcolor=#fefefe
| 502051 ||  || — || September 26, 2006 || Catalina || CSS ||  || align=right data-sort-value="0.66" | 660 m || 
|-id=052 bgcolor=#fefefe
| 502052 ||  || — || November 7, 2010 || Mount Lemmon || Mount Lemmon Survey || NYS || align=right data-sort-value="0.82" | 820 m || 
|-id=053 bgcolor=#d6d6d6
| 502053 ||  || — || October 24, 2013 || Mount Lemmon || Mount Lemmon Survey || KOR || align=right | 1.3 km || 
|-id=054 bgcolor=#E9E9E9
| 502054 ||  || — || April 1, 2011 || Kitt Peak || Spacewatch ||  || align=right | 2.0 km || 
|-id=055 bgcolor=#E9E9E9
| 502055 ||  || — || June 16, 2012 || Mount Lemmon || Mount Lemmon Survey ||  || align=right | 1.8 km || 
|-id=056 bgcolor=#fefefe
| 502056 ||  || — || November 24, 2006 || Kitt Peak || Spacewatch || MAS || align=right data-sort-value="0.76" | 760 m || 
|-id=057 bgcolor=#E9E9E9
| 502057 ||  || — || April 11, 2003 || Kitt Peak || Spacewatch ||  || align=right | 1.3 km || 
|-id=058 bgcolor=#fefefe
| 502058 ||  || — || September 26, 2006 || Catalina || CSS ||  || align=right | 1.0 km || 
|-id=059 bgcolor=#E9E9E9
| 502059 ||  || — || March 31, 2011 || Haleakala || Pan-STARRS ||  || align=right | 1.8 km || 
|-id=060 bgcolor=#E9E9E9
| 502060 ||  || — || January 11, 2011 || Kitt Peak || Spacewatch || (5) || align=right data-sort-value="0.78" | 780 m || 
|-id=061 bgcolor=#E9E9E9
| 502061 ||  || — || November 26, 2005 || Mount Lemmon || Mount Lemmon Survey ||  || align=right | 1.2 km || 
|-id=062 bgcolor=#E9E9E9
| 502062 ||  || — || December 26, 2005 || Kitt Peak || Spacewatch ||  || align=right | 1.2 km || 
|-id=063 bgcolor=#d6d6d6
| 502063 ||  || — || June 16, 2010 || WISE || WISE || EUP || align=right | 3.3 km || 
|-id=064 bgcolor=#E9E9E9
| 502064 ||  || — || October 13, 2013 || Mount Lemmon || Mount Lemmon Survey ||  || align=right | 1.9 km || 
|-id=065 bgcolor=#E9E9E9
| 502065 ||  || — || October 16, 2009 || Mount Lemmon || Mount Lemmon Survey ||  || align=right | 1.0 km || 
|-id=066 bgcolor=#fefefe
| 502066 ||  || — || January 1, 2008 || Kitt Peak || Spacewatch ||  || align=right data-sort-value="0.50" | 500 m || 
|-id=067 bgcolor=#E9E9E9
| 502067 ||  || — || April 25, 2003 || Kitt Peak || Spacewatch ||  || align=right data-sort-value="0.98" | 980 m || 
|-id=068 bgcolor=#d6d6d6
| 502068 ||  || — || December 21, 2014 || Haleakala || Pan-STARRS || HYG || align=right | 2.1 km || 
|-id=069 bgcolor=#E9E9E9
| 502069 ||  || — || January 14, 2015 || Haleakala || Pan-STARRS ||  || align=right | 1.9 km || 
|-id=070 bgcolor=#E9E9E9
| 502070 ||  || — || January 14, 2011 || Kitt Peak || Spacewatch ||  || align=right data-sort-value="0.97" | 970 m || 
|-id=071 bgcolor=#fefefe
| 502071 ||  || — || August 15, 2013 || Haleakala || Pan-STARRS ||  || align=right data-sort-value="0.77" | 770 m || 
|-id=072 bgcolor=#E9E9E9
| 502072 ||  || — || February 25, 2011 || Mount Lemmon || Mount Lemmon Survey ||  || align=right | 1.1 km || 
|-id=073 bgcolor=#fefefe
| 502073 ||  || — || November 10, 1999 || Kitt Peak || Spacewatch || MAS || align=right data-sort-value="0.52" | 520 m || 
|-id=074 bgcolor=#E9E9E9
| 502074 ||  || — || November 11, 2013 || Mount Lemmon || Mount Lemmon Survey ||  || align=right | 2.8 km || 
|-id=075 bgcolor=#d6d6d6
| 502075 ||  || — || September 16, 2006 || Kitt Peak || Spacewatch || TIR || align=right | 2.1 km || 
|-id=076 bgcolor=#fefefe
| 502076 ||  || — || October 15, 1999 || Kitt Peak || Spacewatch ||  || align=right data-sort-value="0.68" | 680 m || 
|-id=077 bgcolor=#E9E9E9
| 502077 ||  || — || March 5, 2011 || Mount Lemmon || Mount Lemmon Survey ||  || align=right | 1.3 km || 
|-id=078 bgcolor=#E9E9E9
| 502078 ||  || — || September 11, 2004 || Kitt Peak || Spacewatch ||  || align=right | 2.1 km || 
|-id=079 bgcolor=#fefefe
| 502079 ||  || — || October 4, 2006 || Mount Lemmon || Mount Lemmon Survey ||  || align=right data-sort-value="0.82" | 820 m || 
|-id=080 bgcolor=#E9E9E9
| 502080 ||  || — || January 15, 2010 || Mount Lemmon || Mount Lemmon Survey ||  || align=right | 2.8 km || 
|-id=081 bgcolor=#E9E9E9
| 502081 ||  || — || November 23, 2000 || Kitt Peak || Spacewatch || WIT || align=right | 1.8 km || 
|-id=082 bgcolor=#d6d6d6
| 502082 ||  || — || January 15, 2015 || Haleakala || Pan-STARRS ||  || align=right | 2.3 km || 
|-id=083 bgcolor=#E9E9E9
| 502083 ||  || — || November 28, 2014 || Haleakala || Pan-STARRS || MAR || align=right data-sort-value="0.91" | 910 m || 
|-id=084 bgcolor=#d6d6d6
| 502084 ||  || — || October 6, 2008 || Kitt Peak || Spacewatch ||  || align=right | 1.9 km || 
|-id=085 bgcolor=#d6d6d6
| 502085 ||  || — || June 16, 2010 || WISE || WISE ||  || align=right | 4.1 km || 
|-id=086 bgcolor=#fefefe
| 502086 ||  || — || November 17, 2006 || Kitt Peak || Spacewatch || NYS || align=right data-sort-value="0.68" | 680 m || 
|-id=087 bgcolor=#E9E9E9
| 502087 ||  || — || August 17, 2009 || Kitt Peak || Spacewatch ||  || align=right data-sort-value="0.98" | 980 m || 
|-id=088 bgcolor=#E9E9E9
| 502088 ||  || — || April 16, 2007 || Mount Lemmon || Mount Lemmon Survey ||  || align=right data-sort-value="0.80" | 800 m || 
|-id=089 bgcolor=#d6d6d6
| 502089 ||  || — || December 21, 2008 || Catalina || CSS ||  || align=right | 3.2 km || 
|-id=090 bgcolor=#d6d6d6
| 502090 ||  || — || May 3, 2011 || Kitt Peak || Spacewatch ||  || align=right | 2.7 km || 
|-id=091 bgcolor=#E9E9E9
| 502091 ||  || — || January 30, 2011 || Haleakala || Pan-STARRS ||  || align=right | 1.5 km || 
|-id=092 bgcolor=#E9E9E9
| 502092 ||  || — || February 4, 2011 || Haleakala || Pan-STARRS ||  || align=right | 1.8 km || 
|-id=093 bgcolor=#E9E9E9
| 502093 ||  || — || March 14, 2007 || Kitt Peak || Spacewatch || EUN || align=right | 1.2 km || 
|-id=094 bgcolor=#d6d6d6
| 502094 ||  || — || May 2, 2006 || Mount Lemmon || Mount Lemmon Survey || EOS || align=right | 2.1 km || 
|-id=095 bgcolor=#fefefe
| 502095 ||  || — || October 22, 2003 || Kitt Peak || Spacewatch ||  || align=right data-sort-value="0.62" | 620 m || 
|-id=096 bgcolor=#E9E9E9
| 502096 ||  || — || April 12, 2011 || Mount Lemmon || Mount Lemmon Survey || AGN || align=right | 1.7 km || 
|-id=097 bgcolor=#E9E9E9
| 502097 ||  || — || December 7, 2005 || Kitt Peak || Spacewatch ||  || align=right | 2.9 km || 
|-id=098 bgcolor=#fefefe
| 502098 ||  || — || August 15, 2013 || Haleakala || Pan-STARRS || V || align=right data-sort-value="0.55" | 550 m || 
|-id=099 bgcolor=#fefefe
| 502099 ||  || — || August 15, 2013 || Haleakala || Pan-STARRS ||  || align=right data-sort-value="0.90" | 900 m || 
|-id=100 bgcolor=#E9E9E9
| 502100 ||  || — || December 11, 2009 || Catalina || CSS ||  || align=right | 2.3 km || 
|}

502101–502200 

|-bgcolor=#d6d6d6
| 502101 ||  || — || January 15, 2015 || Haleakala || Pan-STARRS ||  || align=right | 3.4 km || 
|-id=102 bgcolor=#fefefe
| 502102 ||  || — || August 28, 2005 || Kitt Peak || Spacewatch || H || align=right data-sort-value="0.71" | 710 m || 
|-id=103 bgcolor=#E9E9E9
| 502103 ||  || — || November 4, 2004 || Catalina || CSS ||  || align=right | 2.4 km || 
|-id=104 bgcolor=#fefefe
| 502104 ||  || — || May 16, 2012 || Haleakala || Pan-STARRS ||  || align=right | 1.1 km || 
|-id=105 bgcolor=#d6d6d6
| 502105 ||  || — || November 5, 2005 || Kitt Peak || Spacewatch || 3:2 || align=right | 4.9 km || 
|-id=106 bgcolor=#E9E9E9
| 502106 ||  || — || April 2, 2011 || Haleakala || Pan-STARRS ||  || align=right | 1.9 km || 
|-id=107 bgcolor=#d6d6d6
| 502107 ||  || — || August 14, 2006 || Siding Spring || SSS ||  || align=right | 4.8 km || 
|-id=108 bgcolor=#E9E9E9
| 502108 ||  || — || August 25, 2004 || Kitt Peak || Spacewatch || HNS || align=right | 1.5 km || 
|-id=109 bgcolor=#d6d6d6
| 502109 ||  || — || August 23, 2007 || Kitt Peak || Spacewatch ||  || align=right | 2.6 km || 
|-id=110 bgcolor=#E9E9E9
| 502110 ||  || — || January 24, 2011 || Mount Lemmon || Mount Lemmon Survey ||  || align=right | 1.2 km || 
|-id=111 bgcolor=#d6d6d6
| 502111 ||  || — || September 23, 2008 || Mount Lemmon || Mount Lemmon Survey || KAR || align=right | 2.4 km || 
|-id=112 bgcolor=#fefefe
| 502112 ||  || — || January 2, 2011 || La Sagra || OAM Obs. ||  || align=right | 1.2 km || 
|-id=113 bgcolor=#E9E9E9
| 502113 ||  || — || November 29, 2014 || Haleakala || Pan-STARRS ||  || align=right | 2.9 km || 
|-id=114 bgcolor=#E9E9E9
| 502114 ||  || — || October 11, 2005 || Anderson Mesa || LONEOS ||  || align=right | 1.1 km || 
|-id=115 bgcolor=#fefefe
| 502115 ||  || — || February 9, 2008 || Mount Lemmon || Mount Lemmon Survey ||  || align=right data-sort-value="0.75" | 750 m || 
|-id=116 bgcolor=#E9E9E9
| 502116 ||  || — || January 2, 2011 || Mount Lemmon || Mount Lemmon Survey ||  || align=right | 1.2 km || 
|-id=117 bgcolor=#E9E9E9
| 502117 ||  || — || March 16, 2007 || Kitt Peak || Spacewatch ||  || align=right | 1.2 km || 
|-id=118 bgcolor=#d6d6d6
| 502118 ||  || — || November 21, 2009 || Mount Lemmon || Mount Lemmon Survey ||  || align=right | 3.2 km || 
|-id=119 bgcolor=#E9E9E9
| 502119 ||  || — || February 23, 2007 || Kitt Peak || Spacewatch ||  || align=right data-sort-value="0.88" | 880 m || 
|-id=120 bgcolor=#fefefe
| 502120 ||  || — || March 5, 2008 || Mount Lemmon || Mount Lemmon Survey ||  || align=right data-sort-value="0.91" | 910 m || 
|-id=121 bgcolor=#fefefe
| 502121 ||  || — || September 16, 2003 || Kitt Peak || Spacewatch ||  || align=right data-sort-value="0.70" | 700 m || 
|-id=122 bgcolor=#d6d6d6
| 502122 ||  || — || November 1, 2008 || Mount Lemmon || Mount Lemmon Survey ||  || align=right | 2.3 km || 
|-id=123 bgcolor=#d6d6d6
| 502123 ||  || — || October 2, 2008 || Kitt Peak || Spacewatch || KAR || align=right | 2.2 km || 
|-id=124 bgcolor=#d6d6d6
| 502124 ||  || — || May 26, 2010 || WISE || WISE ||  || align=right | 3.7 km || 
|-id=125 bgcolor=#d6d6d6
| 502125 ||  || — || September 10, 2007 || Mount Lemmon || Mount Lemmon Survey || KOR || align=right | 2.6 km || 
|-id=126 bgcolor=#d6d6d6
| 502126 ||  || — || March 13, 2005 || Kitt Peak || Spacewatch ||  || align=right | 3.1 km || 
|-id=127 bgcolor=#E9E9E9
| 502127 ||  || — || February 1, 2006 || Mount Lemmon || Mount Lemmon Survey ||  || align=right | 2.1 km || 
|-id=128 bgcolor=#d6d6d6
| 502128 ||  || — || May 15, 2010 || WISE || WISE ||  || align=right | 2.7 km || 
|-id=129 bgcolor=#E9E9E9
| 502129 ||  || — || November 30, 2005 || Mount Lemmon || Mount Lemmon Survey || MIS || align=right | 1.2 km || 
|-id=130 bgcolor=#E9E9E9
| 502130 ||  || — || March 14, 2007 || Kitt Peak || Spacewatch ||  || align=right | 1.3 km || 
|-id=131 bgcolor=#d6d6d6
| 502131 ||  || — || April 15, 2010 || Mount Lemmon || Mount Lemmon Survey ||  || align=right | 2.5 km || 
|-id=132 bgcolor=#E9E9E9
| 502132 ||  || — || September 28, 2000 || Kitt Peak || Spacewatch ||  || align=right | 1.4 km || 
|-id=133 bgcolor=#fefefe
| 502133 ||  || — || February 1, 2008 || Mount Lemmon || Mount Lemmon Survey ||  || align=right data-sort-value="0.77" | 770 m || 
|-id=134 bgcolor=#E9E9E9
| 502134 ||  || — || September 7, 2004 || Socorro || LINEAR ||  || align=right | 1.7 km || 
|-id=135 bgcolor=#E9E9E9
| 502135 ||  || — || September 6, 2008 || Mount Lemmon || Mount Lemmon Survey ||  || align=right | 3.8 km || 
|-id=136 bgcolor=#d6d6d6
| 502136 ||  || — || January 16, 2015 || Haleakala || Pan-STARRS ||  || align=right | 2.6 km || 
|-id=137 bgcolor=#E9E9E9
| 502137 ||  || — || January 5, 2006 || Mount Lemmon || Mount Lemmon Survey ||  || align=right | 1.4 km || 
|-id=138 bgcolor=#E9E9E9
| 502138 ||  || — || November 29, 2005 || Mount Lemmon || Mount Lemmon Survey ||  || align=right data-sort-value="0.97" | 970 m || 
|-id=139 bgcolor=#d6d6d6
| 502139 ||  || — || December 30, 2008 || Mount Lemmon || Mount Lemmon Survey || EOS || align=right | 2.7 km || 
|-id=140 bgcolor=#E9E9E9
| 502140 ||  || — || September 14, 2013 || Haleakala || Pan-STARRS ||  || align=right | 1.1 km || 
|-id=141 bgcolor=#d6d6d6
| 502141 ||  || — || February 17, 2010 || Kitt Peak || Spacewatch ||  || align=right | 2.5 km || 
|-id=142 bgcolor=#E9E9E9
| 502142 ||  || — || March 5, 2002 || Kitt Peak || Spacewatch ||  || align=right | 1.3 km || 
|-id=143 bgcolor=#E9E9E9
| 502143 ||  || — || February 27, 2006 || Kitt Peak || Spacewatch || MRX || align=right | 2.2 km || 
|-id=144 bgcolor=#fefefe
| 502144 ||  || — || December 24, 2006 || Kitt Peak || Spacewatch ||  || align=right | 1.0 km || 
|-id=145 bgcolor=#d6d6d6
| 502145 ||  || — || November 20, 2007 || Mount Lemmon || Mount Lemmon Survey ||  || align=right | 3.2 km || 
|-id=146 bgcolor=#d6d6d6
| 502146 ||  || — || March 18, 2010 || Mount Lemmon || Mount Lemmon Survey ||  || align=right | 2.4 km || 
|-id=147 bgcolor=#d6d6d6
| 502147 ||  || — || May 26, 2010 || WISE || WISE ||  || align=right | 4.2 km || 
|-id=148 bgcolor=#E9E9E9
| 502148 ||  || — || December 30, 2005 || Kitt Peak || Spacewatch ||  || align=right | 1.7 km || 
|-id=149 bgcolor=#fefefe
| 502149 ||  || — || December 29, 2003 || Kitt Peak || Spacewatch ||  || align=right data-sort-value="0.76" | 760 m || 
|-id=150 bgcolor=#d6d6d6
| 502150 ||  || — || June 4, 2011 || Mount Lemmon || Mount Lemmon Survey ||  || align=right | 2.9 km || 
|-id=151 bgcolor=#E9E9E9
| 502151 ||  || — || March 3, 1997 || Kitt Peak || Spacewatch ||  || align=right | 1.9 km || 
|-id=152 bgcolor=#fefefe
| 502152 ||  || — || February 11, 2004 || Kitt Peak || Spacewatch || MAS || align=right data-sort-value="0.49" | 490 m || 
|-id=153 bgcolor=#d6d6d6
| 502153 ||  || — || December 18, 2007 || Kitt Peak || Spacewatch ||  || align=right | 5.6 km || 
|-id=154 bgcolor=#d6d6d6
| 502154 ||  || — || December 31, 2008 || Kitt Peak || Spacewatch ||  || align=right | 2.9 km || 
|-id=155 bgcolor=#fefefe
| 502155 ||  || — || August 29, 2013 || Haleakala || Pan-STARRS ||  || align=right data-sort-value="0.89" | 890 m || 
|-id=156 bgcolor=#E9E9E9
| 502156 ||  || — || March 15, 2007 || Kitt Peak || Spacewatch ||  || align=right | 1.7 km || 
|-id=157 bgcolor=#E9E9E9
| 502157 ||  || — || May 5, 2008 || Mount Lemmon || Mount Lemmon Survey ||  || align=right data-sort-value="0.91" | 910 m || 
|-id=158 bgcolor=#E9E9E9
| 502158 ||  || — || April 7, 2007 || Mount Lemmon || Mount Lemmon Survey || WIT || align=right | 1.4 km || 
|-id=159 bgcolor=#fefefe
| 502159 ||  || — || February 28, 2012 || Haleakala || Pan-STARRS ||  || align=right data-sort-value="0.66" | 660 m || 
|-id=160 bgcolor=#fefefe
| 502160 ||  || — || February 10, 2008 || Kitt Peak || Spacewatch ||  || align=right data-sort-value="0.91" | 910 m || 
|-id=161 bgcolor=#fefefe
| 502161 ||  || — || January 29, 2004 || Kitt Peak || Spacewatch ||  || align=right data-sort-value="0.66" | 660 m || 
|-id=162 bgcolor=#E9E9E9
| 502162 ||  || — || December 10, 2005 || Kitt Peak || Spacewatch ||  || align=right | 1.3 km || 
|-id=163 bgcolor=#E9E9E9
| 502163 ||  || — || November 1, 2013 || Mount Lemmon || Mount Lemmon Survey ||  || align=right | 1.4 km || 
|-id=164 bgcolor=#E9E9E9
| 502164 ||  || — || January 7, 2006 || Kitt Peak || Spacewatch ||  || align=right | 1.8 km || 
|-id=165 bgcolor=#fefefe
| 502165 ||  || — || December 29, 2003 || Kitt Peak || Spacewatch || NYS || align=right data-sort-value="0.50" | 500 m || 
|-id=166 bgcolor=#fefefe
| 502166 ||  || — || December 17, 2003 || Kitt Peak || Spacewatch ||  || align=right data-sort-value="0.74" | 740 m || 
|-id=167 bgcolor=#fefefe
| 502167 ||  || — || September 30, 2006 || Kitt Peak || Spacewatch || MAS || align=right data-sort-value="0.57" | 570 m || 
|-id=168 bgcolor=#d6d6d6
| 502168 ||  || — || November 3, 2007 || Mount Lemmon || Mount Lemmon Survey || URS || align=right | 3.1 km || 
|-id=169 bgcolor=#E9E9E9
| 502169 ||  || — || January 30, 2011 || Haleakala || Pan-STARRS ||  || align=right data-sort-value="0.85" | 850 m || 
|-id=170 bgcolor=#E9E9E9
| 502170 ||  || — || January 23, 2006 || Kitt Peak || Spacewatch ||  || align=right | 2.3 km || 
|-id=171 bgcolor=#d6d6d6
| 502171 ||  || — || June 25, 2010 || WISE || WISE ||  || align=right | 2.7 km || 
|-id=172 bgcolor=#fefefe
| 502172 ||  || — || December 10, 2010 || Kitt Peak || Spacewatch || MAS || align=right data-sort-value="0.76" | 760 m || 
|-id=173 bgcolor=#d6d6d6
| 502173 ||  || — || March 12, 2010 || Kitt Peak || Spacewatch || THM || align=right | 2.4 km || 
|-id=174 bgcolor=#fefefe
| 502174 ||  || — || February 3, 2008 || Kitt Peak || Spacewatch ||  || align=right data-sort-value="0.83" | 830 m || 
|-id=175 bgcolor=#fefefe
| 502175 ||  || — || January 18, 2004 || Kitt Peak || Spacewatch ||  || align=right | 1.0 km || 
|-id=176 bgcolor=#d6d6d6
| 502176 ||  || — || August 10, 2007 || Kitt Peak || Spacewatch ||  || align=right | 2.8 km || 
|-id=177 bgcolor=#E9E9E9
| 502177 ||  || — || October 27, 2009 || Catalina || CSS ||  || align=right | 2.1 km || 
|-id=178 bgcolor=#fefefe
| 502178 ||  || — || November 11, 2010 || Mount Lemmon || Mount Lemmon Survey ||  || align=right data-sort-value="0.80" | 800 m || 
|-id=179 bgcolor=#d6d6d6
| 502179 ||  || — || January 17, 2015 || Haleakala || Pan-STARRS ||  || align=right | 2.8 km || 
|-id=180 bgcolor=#d6d6d6
| 502180 ||  || — || March 4, 2005 || Kitt Peak || Spacewatch || EOS || align=right | 2.6 km || 
|-id=181 bgcolor=#E9E9E9
| 502181 ||  || — || October 3, 1999 || Kitt Peak || Spacewatch || WIT || align=right | 2.1 km || 
|-id=182 bgcolor=#d6d6d6
| 502182 ||  || — || February 16, 2004 || Kitt Peak || Spacewatch || HYG || align=right | 3.2 km || 
|-id=183 bgcolor=#E9E9E9
| 502183 ||  || — || January 14, 2010 || Kitt Peak || Spacewatch || HOF || align=right | 3.1 km || 
|-id=184 bgcolor=#fefefe
| 502184 ||  || — || September 12, 1994 || Kitt Peak || Spacewatch ||  || align=right data-sort-value="0.95" | 950 m || 
|-id=185 bgcolor=#E9E9E9
| 502185 ||  || — || September 21, 2008 || Mount Lemmon || Mount Lemmon Survey ||  || align=right | 2.0 km || 
|-id=186 bgcolor=#d6d6d6
| 502186 ||  || — || October 5, 2013 || Kitt Peak || Spacewatch || KOR || align=right | 1.9 km || 
|-id=187 bgcolor=#d6d6d6
| 502187 ||  || — || December 22, 2008 || Kitt Peak || Spacewatch ||  || align=right | 3.0 km || 
|-id=188 bgcolor=#d6d6d6
| 502188 ||  || — || December 21, 2008 || Mount Lemmon || Mount Lemmon Survey ||  || align=right | 2.8 km || 
|-id=189 bgcolor=#d6d6d6
| 502189 ||  || — || April 6, 2010 || Kitt Peak || Spacewatch || VER || align=right | 3.3 km || 
|-id=190 bgcolor=#fefefe
| 502190 ||  || — || April 1, 2008 || Mount Lemmon || Mount Lemmon Survey ||  || align=right data-sort-value="0.71" | 710 m || 
|-id=191 bgcolor=#d6d6d6
| 502191 ||  || — || November 30, 2008 || Kitt Peak || Spacewatch || THM || align=right | 2.7 km || 
|-id=192 bgcolor=#d6d6d6
| 502192 ||  || — || November 18, 2008 || Kitt Peak || Spacewatch ||  || align=right | 2.9 km || 
|-id=193 bgcolor=#E9E9E9
| 502193 ||  || — || September 7, 2004 || Kitt Peak || Spacewatch ||  || align=right | 1.4 km || 
|-id=194 bgcolor=#E9E9E9
| 502194 ||  || — || November 26, 2009 || Mount Lemmon || Mount Lemmon Survey ||  || align=right | 1.5 km || 
|-id=195 bgcolor=#E9E9E9
| 502195 ||  || — || October 1, 2008 || Mount Lemmon || Mount Lemmon Survey ||  || align=right | 2.0 km || 
|-id=196 bgcolor=#E9E9E9
| 502196 ||  || — || December 7, 2005 || Kitt Peak || Spacewatch ||  || align=right | 1.2 km || 
|-id=197 bgcolor=#E9E9E9
| 502197 ||  || — || November 22, 2009 || Mount Lemmon || Mount Lemmon Survey ||  || align=right | 1.5 km || 
|-id=198 bgcolor=#d6d6d6
| 502198 ||  || — || December 29, 2008 || Kitt Peak || Spacewatch || HYG || align=right | 2.6 km || 
|-id=199 bgcolor=#E9E9E9
| 502199 ||  || — || April 13, 2011 || Mount Lemmon || Mount Lemmon Survey ||  || align=right | 2.0 km || 
|-id=200 bgcolor=#E9E9E9
| 502200 ||  || — || September 5, 2008 || Kitt Peak || Spacewatch || HOF || align=right | 2.3 km || 
|}

502201–502300 

|-bgcolor=#E9E9E9
| 502201 ||  || — || August 20, 2004 || Kitt Peak || Spacewatch ||  || align=right | 1.6 km || 
|-id=202 bgcolor=#E9E9E9
| 502202 ||  || — || September 14, 2013 || Haleakala || Pan-STARRS ||  || align=right | 2.1 km || 
|-id=203 bgcolor=#E9E9E9
| 502203 ||  || — || January 26, 2006 || Mount Lemmon || Mount Lemmon Survey ||  || align=right | 2.0 km || 
|-id=204 bgcolor=#d6d6d6
| 502204 ||  || — || June 1, 2010 || WISE || WISE ||  || align=right | 2.2 km || 
|-id=205 bgcolor=#E9E9E9
| 502205 ||  || — || February 11, 2002 || Kitt Peak || Spacewatch ||  || align=right | 1.3 km || 
|-id=206 bgcolor=#E9E9E9
| 502206 ||  || — || January 31, 2006 || Kitt Peak || Spacewatch || AGN || align=right | 1.6 km || 
|-id=207 bgcolor=#E9E9E9
| 502207 ||  || — || August 29, 2013 || Haleakala || Pan-STARRS ||  || align=right | 2.0 km || 
|-id=208 bgcolor=#d6d6d6
| 502208 ||  || — || February 16, 2010 || Kitt Peak || Spacewatch ||  || align=right | 3.0 km || 
|-id=209 bgcolor=#E9E9E9
| 502209 ||  || — || October 13, 2013 || Mount Lemmon || Mount Lemmon Survey || AGN || align=right | 2.0 km || 
|-id=210 bgcolor=#d6d6d6
| 502210 ||  || — || April 10, 2005 || Mount Lemmon || Mount Lemmon Survey ||  || align=right | 2.6 km || 
|-id=211 bgcolor=#d6d6d6
| 502211 ||  || — || May 13, 2011 || Mount Lemmon || Mount Lemmon Survey ||  || align=right | 3.1 km || 
|-id=212 bgcolor=#fefefe
| 502212 ||  || — || March 4, 2005 || Mount Lemmon || Mount Lemmon Survey ||  || align=right data-sort-value="0.54" | 540 m || 
|-id=213 bgcolor=#fefefe
| 502213 ||  || — || October 2, 2006 || Catalina || CSS ||  || align=right data-sort-value="0.83" | 830 m || 
|-id=214 bgcolor=#fefefe
| 502214 ||  || — || November 13, 2006 || Catalina || CSS ||  || align=right data-sort-value="0.96" | 960 m || 
|-id=215 bgcolor=#E9E9E9
| 502215 ||  || — || February 10, 2010 || WISE || WISE ||  || align=right | 4.2 km || 
|-id=216 bgcolor=#fefefe
| 502216 ||  || — || October 16, 2006 || Catalina || CSS ||  || align=right data-sort-value="0.72" | 720 m || 
|-id=217 bgcolor=#E9E9E9
| 502217 ||  || — || January 8, 2002 || Kitt Peak || Spacewatch ||  || align=right | 1.5 km || 
|-id=218 bgcolor=#E9E9E9
| 502218 ||  || — || November 9, 2009 || Mount Lemmon || Mount Lemmon Survey ||  || align=right | 1.3 km || 
|-id=219 bgcolor=#d6d6d6
| 502219 ||  || — || December 21, 2014 || Mount Lemmon || Mount Lemmon Survey || URS || align=right | 3.7 km || 
|-id=220 bgcolor=#E9E9E9
| 502220 ||  || — || November 6, 2005 || Mount Lemmon || Mount Lemmon Survey ||  || align=right data-sort-value="0.99" | 990 m || 
|-id=221 bgcolor=#d6d6d6
| 502221 ||  || — || April 2, 2005 || Mount Lemmon || Mount Lemmon Survey || THM || align=right | 2.5 km || 
|-id=222 bgcolor=#d6d6d6
| 502222 ||  || — || December 22, 2008 || Kitt Peak || Spacewatch ||  || align=right | 2.9 km || 
|-id=223 bgcolor=#E9E9E9
| 502223 ||  || — || December 20, 2009 || Kitt Peak || Spacewatch ||  || align=right | 1.8 km || 
|-id=224 bgcolor=#E9E9E9
| 502224 ||  || — || November 3, 2005 || Catalina || CSS ||  || align=right | 1.1 km || 
|-id=225 bgcolor=#fefefe
| 502225 ||  || — || January 13, 2008 || Mount Lemmon || Mount Lemmon Survey ||  || align=right data-sort-value="0.56" | 560 m || 
|-id=226 bgcolor=#E9E9E9
| 502226 ||  || — || September 4, 2008 || Kitt Peak || Spacewatch ||  || align=right | 1.9 km || 
|-id=227 bgcolor=#fefefe
| 502227 ||  || — || January 16, 2011 || Mount Lemmon || Mount Lemmon Survey ||  || align=right data-sort-value="0.84" | 840 m || 
|-id=228 bgcolor=#fefefe
| 502228 ||  || — || October 19, 2010 || Mount Lemmon || Mount Lemmon Survey ||  || align=right data-sort-value="0.66" | 660 m || 
|-id=229 bgcolor=#E9E9E9
| 502229 ||  || — || September 3, 1999 || Kitt Peak || Spacewatch ||  || align=right | 2.1 km || 
|-id=230 bgcolor=#E9E9E9
| 502230 ||  || — || March 9, 2003 || Kitt Peak || Spacewatch ||  || align=right | 1.1 km || 
|-id=231 bgcolor=#fefefe
| 502231 ||  || — || November 11, 2006 || Kitt Peak || Spacewatch || MAS || align=right data-sort-value="0.72" | 720 m || 
|-id=232 bgcolor=#E9E9E9
| 502232 ||  || — || March 27, 2011 || Mount Lemmon || Mount Lemmon Survey ||  || align=right | 1.5 km || 
|-id=233 bgcolor=#fefefe
| 502233 ||  || — || October 21, 1998 || Caussols || ODAS || NYS || align=right data-sort-value="0.75" | 750 m || 
|-id=234 bgcolor=#E9E9E9
| 502234 ||  || — || January 18, 2015 || Mount Lemmon || Mount Lemmon Survey || KAZ || align=right | 1.2 km || 
|-id=235 bgcolor=#E9E9E9
| 502235 ||  || — || February 11, 2002 || Socorro || LINEAR ||  || align=right | 1.4 km || 
|-id=236 bgcolor=#E9E9E9
| 502236 ||  || — || January 21, 2010 || WISE || WISE ||  || align=right | 2.4 km || 
|-id=237 bgcolor=#d6d6d6
| 502237 ||  || — || March 12, 2010 || Mount Lemmon || Mount Lemmon Survey ||  || align=right | 2.5 km || 
|-id=238 bgcolor=#E9E9E9
| 502238 ||  || — || October 9, 2004 || Kitt Peak || Spacewatch || AGN || align=right | 2.0 km || 
|-id=239 bgcolor=#E9E9E9
| 502239 ||  || — || January 4, 2011 || Mount Lemmon || Mount Lemmon Survey ||  || align=right data-sort-value="0.81" | 810 m || 
|-id=240 bgcolor=#fefefe
| 502240 ||  || — || March 4, 2008 || Mount Lemmon || Mount Lemmon Survey ||  || align=right data-sort-value="0.73" | 730 m || 
|-id=241 bgcolor=#fefefe
| 502241 ||  || — || July 14, 2013 || Haleakala || Pan-STARRS ||  || align=right data-sort-value="0.57" | 570 m || 
|-id=242 bgcolor=#E9E9E9
| 502242 ||  || — || September 16, 2004 || Anderson Mesa || LONEOS ||  || align=right | 1.8 km || 
|-id=243 bgcolor=#d6d6d6
| 502243 ||  || — || March 10, 2005 || Mount Lemmon || Mount Lemmon Survey ||  || align=right | 2.3 km || 
|-id=244 bgcolor=#d6d6d6
| 502244 ||  || — || October 9, 2013 || Mount Lemmon || Mount Lemmon Survey || KOR || align=right | 1.1 km || 
|-id=245 bgcolor=#E9E9E9
| 502245 ||  || — || November 23, 2009 || Kitt Peak || Spacewatch ||  || align=right | 1.8 km || 
|-id=246 bgcolor=#fefefe
| 502246 ||  || — || December 13, 2006 || Mount Lemmon || Mount Lemmon Survey || NYS || align=right data-sort-value="0.56" | 560 m || 
|-id=247 bgcolor=#E9E9E9
| 502247 ||  || — || October 30, 2005 || Mount Lemmon || Mount Lemmon Survey ||  || align=right | 1.1 km || 
|-id=248 bgcolor=#d6d6d6
| 502248 ||  || — || June 8, 2011 || Mount Lemmon || Mount Lemmon Survey ||  || align=right | 3.1 km || 
|-id=249 bgcolor=#E9E9E9
| 502249 ||  || — || October 2, 2013 || Haleakala || Pan-STARRS ||  || align=right | 1.3 km || 
|-id=250 bgcolor=#E9E9E9
| 502250 ||  || — || July 30, 2008 || Mount Lemmon || Mount Lemmon Survey ||  || align=right | 1.5 km || 
|-id=251 bgcolor=#d6d6d6
| 502251 ||  || — || January 16, 2015 || Haleakala || Pan-STARRS || EOS || align=right | 1.6 km || 
|-id=252 bgcolor=#d6d6d6
| 502252 ||  || — || February 9, 2010 || Kitt Peak || Spacewatch || NAE || align=right | 2.1 km || 
|-id=253 bgcolor=#E9E9E9
| 502253 ||  || — || September 11, 2004 || Kitt Peak || Spacewatch ||  || align=right | 2.3 km || 
|-id=254 bgcolor=#d6d6d6
| 502254 ||  || — || May 9, 2010 || WISE || WISE ||  || align=right | 2.5 km || 
|-id=255 bgcolor=#d6d6d6
| 502255 ||  || — || November 23, 2003 || Kitt Peak || Spacewatch ||  || align=right | 2.9 km || 
|-id=256 bgcolor=#E9E9E9
| 502256 ||  || — || March 10, 2002 || Cima Ekar || ADAS ||  || align=right | 1.8 km || 
|-id=257 bgcolor=#E9E9E9
| 502257 ||  || — || November 4, 2013 || Mount Lemmon || Mount Lemmon Survey ||  || align=right | 1.3 km || 
|-id=258 bgcolor=#fefefe
| 502258 ||  || — || December 14, 1998 || Kitt Peak || Spacewatch ||  || align=right data-sort-value="0.75" | 750 m || 
|-id=259 bgcolor=#E9E9E9
| 502259 ||  || — || January 25, 2006 || Kitt Peak || Spacewatch || MRX || align=right | 1.0 km || 
|-id=260 bgcolor=#E9E9E9
| 502260 ||  || — || January 31, 2006 || Kitt Peak || Spacewatch ||  || align=right | 1.9 km || 
|-id=261 bgcolor=#E9E9E9
| 502261 ||  || — || November 20, 2009 || Kitt Peak || Spacewatch ||  || align=right | 1.6 km || 
|-id=262 bgcolor=#E9E9E9
| 502262 ||  || — || August 4, 2008 || Siding Spring || SSS ||  || align=right | 2.8 km || 
|-id=263 bgcolor=#E9E9E9
| 502263 ||  || — || October 24, 2005 || Kitt Peak || Spacewatch ||  || align=right | 1.0 km || 
|-id=264 bgcolor=#E9E9E9
| 502264 ||  || — || April 23, 2007 || Kitt Peak || Spacewatch ||  || align=right | 1.6 km || 
|-id=265 bgcolor=#d6d6d6
| 502265 ||  || — || May 10, 2010 || WISE || WISE ||  || align=right | 3.4 km || 
|-id=266 bgcolor=#E9E9E9
| 502266 ||  || — || January 17, 2015 || Haleakala || Pan-STARRS || WIT || align=right | 2.2 km || 
|-id=267 bgcolor=#E9E9E9
| 502267 ||  || — || March 30, 2011 || Mount Lemmon || Mount Lemmon Survey || AGN || align=right | 1.0 km || 
|-id=268 bgcolor=#E9E9E9
| 502268 ||  || — || April 6, 2011 || Mount Lemmon || Mount Lemmon Survey ||  || align=right | 1.6 km || 
|-id=269 bgcolor=#d6d6d6
| 502269 ||  || — || June 10, 2010 || WISE || WISE ||  || align=right | 2.9 km || 
|-id=270 bgcolor=#E9E9E9
| 502270 ||  || — || December 27, 2005 || Kitt Peak || Spacewatch || WIT || align=right | 1.5 km || 
|-id=271 bgcolor=#E9E9E9
| 502271 ||  || — || August 28, 2009 || Kitt Peak || Spacewatch ||  || align=right data-sort-value="0.60" | 600 m || 
|-id=272 bgcolor=#E9E9E9
| 502272 ||  || — || October 2, 2008 || Mount Lemmon || Mount Lemmon Survey ||  || align=right | 1.7 km || 
|-id=273 bgcolor=#E9E9E9
| 502273 ||  || — || December 14, 1995 || Kitt Peak || Spacewatch || AEO || align=right | 1.3 km || 
|-id=274 bgcolor=#fefefe
| 502274 ||  || — || October 4, 2006 || Mount Lemmon || Mount Lemmon Survey || NYS || align=right data-sort-value="0.57" | 570 m || 
|-id=275 bgcolor=#d6d6d6
| 502275 ||  || — || September 4, 2008 || Kitt Peak || Spacewatch ||  || align=right | 2.1 km || 
|-id=276 bgcolor=#d6d6d6
| 502276 ||  || — || November 8, 2008 || Mount Lemmon || Mount Lemmon Survey || EOS || align=right | 1.5 km || 
|-id=277 bgcolor=#E9E9E9
| 502277 ||  || — || August 30, 2005 || Kitt Peak || Spacewatch ||  || align=right data-sort-value="0.91" | 910 m || 
|-id=278 bgcolor=#E9E9E9
| 502278 ||  || — || September 28, 2013 || Mount Lemmon || Mount Lemmon Survey ||  || align=right | 2.1 km || 
|-id=279 bgcolor=#E9E9E9
| 502279 ||  || — || December 14, 2001 || Kitt Peak || Spacewatch ||  || align=right | 1.6 km || 
|-id=280 bgcolor=#fefefe
| 502280 ||  || — || August 17, 1999 || Kitt Peak || Spacewatch ||  || align=right data-sort-value="0.62" | 620 m || 
|-id=281 bgcolor=#E9E9E9
| 502281 ||  || — || January 26, 2006 || Kitt Peak || Spacewatch ||  || align=right | 2.9 km || 
|-id=282 bgcolor=#d6d6d6
| 502282 ||  || — || June 2, 2010 || WISE || WISE || EUP || align=right | 4.7 km || 
|-id=283 bgcolor=#E9E9E9
| 502283 ||  || — || October 5, 2013 || Haleakala || Pan-STARRS || WIT || align=right data-sort-value="0.76" | 760 m || 
|-id=284 bgcolor=#E9E9E9
| 502284 ||  || — || September 24, 2008 || Kitt Peak || Spacewatch ||  || align=right | 2.0 km || 
|-id=285 bgcolor=#d6d6d6
| 502285 ||  || — || September 10, 2007 || Mount Lemmon || Mount Lemmon Survey ||  || align=right | 2.9 km || 
|-id=286 bgcolor=#E9E9E9
| 502286 ||  || — || October 2, 2013 || Kitt Peak || Spacewatch ||  || align=right | 2.0 km || 
|-id=287 bgcolor=#fefefe
| 502287 ||  || — || October 13, 2010 || Mount Lemmon || Mount Lemmon Survey ||  || align=right data-sort-value="0.73" | 730 m || 
|-id=288 bgcolor=#E9E9E9
| 502288 ||  || — || April 22, 2007 || Kitt Peak || Spacewatch || WIT || align=right data-sort-value="0.92" | 920 m || 
|-id=289 bgcolor=#E9E9E9
| 502289 ||  || — || January 25, 2011 || Mount Lemmon || Mount Lemmon Survey ||  || align=right data-sort-value="0.99" | 990 m || 
|-id=290 bgcolor=#d6d6d6
| 502290 ||  || — || March 25, 2010 || Kitt Peak || Spacewatch ||  || align=right | 2.7 km || 
|-id=291 bgcolor=#fefefe
| 502291 ||  || — || April 7, 2008 || Kitt Peak || Spacewatch ||  || align=right data-sort-value="0.87" | 870 m || 
|-id=292 bgcolor=#E9E9E9
| 502292 ||  || — || September 18, 2009 || Mount Lemmon || Mount Lemmon Survey ||  || align=right | 1.4 km || 
|-id=293 bgcolor=#E9E9E9
| 502293 ||  || — || March 29, 2011 || Mount Lemmon || Mount Lemmon Survey ||  || align=right | 1.9 km || 
|-id=294 bgcolor=#d6d6d6
| 502294 ||  || — || December 3, 2008 || Kitt Peak || Spacewatch ||  || align=right | 3.0 km || 
|-id=295 bgcolor=#E9E9E9
| 502295 ||  || — || April 9, 2003 || Kitt Peak || Spacewatch ||  || align=right | 1.00 km || 
|-id=296 bgcolor=#fefefe
| 502296 ||  || — || October 2, 2006 || Mount Lemmon || Mount Lemmon Survey ||  || align=right data-sort-value="0.55" | 550 m || 
|-id=297 bgcolor=#d6d6d6
| 502297 ||  || — || July 19, 2011 || Haleakala || Pan-STARRS ||  || align=right | 3.0 km || 
|-id=298 bgcolor=#fefefe
| 502298 ||  || — || August 4, 2013 || Haleakala || Pan-STARRS ||  || align=right data-sort-value="0.84" | 840 m || 
|-id=299 bgcolor=#d6d6d6
| 502299 ||  || — || May 3, 2005 || Kitt Peak || Spacewatch ||  || align=right | 2.5 km || 
|-id=300 bgcolor=#E9E9E9
| 502300 ||  || — || September 6, 2008 || Mount Lemmon || Mount Lemmon Survey ||  || align=right | 1.8 km || 
|}

502301–502400 

|-bgcolor=#fefefe
| 502301 ||  || — || December 6, 2010 || Mount Lemmon || Mount Lemmon Survey ||  || align=right data-sort-value="0.80" | 800 m || 
|-id=302 bgcolor=#d6d6d6
| 502302 ||  || — || September 22, 2008 || Kitt Peak || Spacewatch || KOR || align=right | 1.2 km || 
|-id=303 bgcolor=#fefefe
| 502303 ||  || — || December 6, 2010 || Kitt Peak || Spacewatch ||  || align=right data-sort-value="0.89" | 890 m || 
|-id=304 bgcolor=#d6d6d6
| 502304 ||  || — || March 9, 1999 || Kitt Peak || Spacewatch || EOS || align=right | 1.9 km || 
|-id=305 bgcolor=#d6d6d6
| 502305 ||  || — || March 3, 2005 || Kitt Peak || Spacewatch ||  || align=right | 2.4 km || 
|-id=306 bgcolor=#E9E9E9
| 502306 ||  || — || October 31, 2013 || Kitt Peak || Spacewatch ||  || align=right | 2.2 km || 
|-id=307 bgcolor=#E9E9E9
| 502307 ||  || — || October 15, 2013 || Kitt Peak || Spacewatch || HOF || align=right | 2.3 km || 
|-id=308 bgcolor=#E9E9E9
| 502308 ||  || — || September 6, 2008 || Kitt Peak || Spacewatch ||  || align=right | 1.7 km || 
|-id=309 bgcolor=#d6d6d6
| 502309 ||  || — || September 6, 2013 || Mount Lemmon || Mount Lemmon Survey ||  || align=right | 2.2 km || 
|-id=310 bgcolor=#E9E9E9
| 502310 ||  || — || September 22, 2009 || Mount Lemmon || Mount Lemmon Survey ||  || align=right | 1.3 km || 
|-id=311 bgcolor=#fefefe
| 502311 ||  || — || December 13, 2010 || Mount Lemmon || Mount Lemmon Survey ||  || align=right data-sort-value="0.69" | 690 m || 
|-id=312 bgcolor=#d6d6d6
| 502312 ||  || — || January 17, 2015 || Haleakala || Pan-STARRS ||  || align=right | 2.7 km || 
|-id=313 bgcolor=#fefefe
| 502313 ||  || — || December 8, 2010 || Mount Lemmon || Mount Lemmon Survey ||  || align=right data-sort-value="0.66" | 660 m || 
|-id=314 bgcolor=#d6d6d6
| 502314 ||  || — || February 15, 2010 || Mount Lemmon || Mount Lemmon Survey || EOS || align=right | 1.4 km || 
|-id=315 bgcolor=#d6d6d6
| 502315 ||  || — || January 15, 2010 || Mount Lemmon || Mount Lemmon Survey ||  || align=right | 2.6 km || 
|-id=316 bgcolor=#E9E9E9
| 502316 ||  || — || February 9, 2010 || Mount Lemmon || Mount Lemmon Survey ||  || align=right | 2.3 km || 
|-id=317 bgcolor=#E9E9E9
| 502317 ||  || — || January 17, 2015 || Mount Lemmon || Mount Lemmon Survey ||  || align=right | 2.5 km || 
|-id=318 bgcolor=#d6d6d6
| 502318 ||  || — || February 16, 2010 || Kitt Peak || Spacewatch || TEL || align=right | 1.1 km || 
|-id=319 bgcolor=#E9E9E9
| 502319 ||  || — || September 14, 1994 || Kitt Peak || Spacewatch || AGN || align=right | 1.1 km || 
|-id=320 bgcolor=#E9E9E9
| 502320 ||  || — || April 1, 2011 || Mount Lemmon || Mount Lemmon Survey || AGN || align=right | 1.2 km || 
|-id=321 bgcolor=#E9E9E9
| 502321 ||  || — || September 4, 2008 || Kitt Peak || Spacewatch || AGN || align=right | 1.1 km || 
|-id=322 bgcolor=#E9E9E9
| 502322 ||  || — || March 2, 2011 || Mount Lemmon || Mount Lemmon Survey || WIT || align=right | 2.1 km || 
|-id=323 bgcolor=#E9E9E9
| 502323 ||  || — || January 30, 2011 || Haleakala || Pan-STARRS || MAR || align=right data-sort-value="0.79" | 790 m || 
|-id=324 bgcolor=#E9E9E9
| 502324 ||  || — || October 3, 2013 || Haleakala || Pan-STARRS || HOF || align=right | 1.9 km || 
|-id=325 bgcolor=#d6d6d6
| 502325 ||  || — || November 1, 2013 || Kitt Peak || Spacewatch || 628 || align=right | 2.1 km || 
|-id=326 bgcolor=#E9E9E9
| 502326 ||  || — || January 22, 2006 || Mount Lemmon || Mount Lemmon Survey || WIT || align=right | 1.3 km || 
|-id=327 bgcolor=#fefefe
| 502327 ||  || — || July 28, 2009 || Catalina || CSS ||  || align=right | 1.1 km || 
|-id=328 bgcolor=#d6d6d6
| 502328 ||  || — || March 11, 2005 || Kitt Peak || Spacewatch || THM || align=right | 2.6 km || 
|-id=329 bgcolor=#E9E9E9
| 502329 ||  || — || December 29, 2005 || Kitt Peak || Spacewatch ||  || align=right | 1.3 km || 
|-id=330 bgcolor=#d6d6d6
| 502330 ||  || — || June 4, 2010 || WISE || WISE ||  || align=right | 2.4 km || 
|-id=331 bgcolor=#fefefe
| 502331 ||  || — || September 30, 2006 || Mount Lemmon || Mount Lemmon Survey || MAS || align=right data-sort-value="0.63" | 630 m || 
|-id=332 bgcolor=#E9E9E9
| 502332 ||  || — || January 30, 2011 || Haleakala || Pan-STARRS ||  || align=right | 1.2 km || 
|-id=333 bgcolor=#d6d6d6
| 502333 ||  || — || February 14, 2010 || Kitt Peak || Spacewatch ||  || align=right | 4.1 km || 
|-id=334 bgcolor=#E9E9E9
| 502334 ||  || — || February 4, 2011 || Haleakala || Pan-STARRS || ADE || align=right data-sort-value="0.80" | 800 m || 
|-id=335 bgcolor=#E9E9E9
| 502335 ||  || — || March 10, 2003 || Kitt Peak || Spacewatch ||  || align=right | 3.1 km || 
|-id=336 bgcolor=#E9E9E9
| 502336 ||  || — || January 17, 2015 || Haleakala || Pan-STARRS ||  || align=right | 2.1 km || 
|-id=337 bgcolor=#fefefe
| 502337 ||  || — || November 23, 2006 || Mount Lemmon || Mount Lemmon Survey ||  || align=right data-sort-value="0.80" | 800 m || 
|-id=338 bgcolor=#E9E9E9
| 502338 ||  || — || October 23, 2004 || Kitt Peak || Spacewatch ||  || align=right | 2.1 km || 
|-id=339 bgcolor=#d6d6d6
| 502339 ||  || — || January 2, 2009 || Mount Lemmon || Mount Lemmon Survey ||  || align=right | 2.8 km || 
|-id=340 bgcolor=#E9E9E9
| 502340 ||  || — || May 6, 2008 || Mount Lemmon || Mount Lemmon Survey ||  || align=right | 1.0 km || 
|-id=341 bgcolor=#E9E9E9
| 502341 ||  || — || February 11, 2002 || Socorro || LINEAR ||  || align=right | 1.8 km || 
|-id=342 bgcolor=#E9E9E9
| 502342 ||  || — || December 11, 2009 || Mount Lemmon || Mount Lemmon Survey ||  || align=right | 1.5 km || 
|-id=343 bgcolor=#E9E9E9
| 502343 ||  || — || September 28, 2013 || Mount Lemmon || Mount Lemmon Survey ||  || align=right | 1.9 km || 
|-id=344 bgcolor=#fefefe
| 502344 ||  || — || August 14, 2013 || Haleakala || Pan-STARRS ||  || align=right data-sort-value="0.61" | 610 m || 
|-id=345 bgcolor=#E9E9E9
| 502345 ||  || — || March 27, 2011 || Mount Lemmon || Mount Lemmon Survey || PAD || align=right | 1.5 km || 
|-id=346 bgcolor=#E9E9E9
| 502346 ||  || — || August 27, 2009 || Kitt Peak || Spacewatch ||  || align=right data-sort-value="0.74" | 740 m || 
|-id=347 bgcolor=#E9E9E9
| 502347 ||  || — || February 25, 2006 || Kitt Peak || Spacewatch ||  || align=right | 2.1 km || 
|-id=348 bgcolor=#d6d6d6
| 502348 ||  || — || July 25, 2006 || Mount Lemmon || Mount Lemmon Survey ||  || align=right | 3.1 km || 
|-id=349 bgcolor=#d6d6d6
| 502349 ||  || — || December 31, 2008 || Kitt Peak || Spacewatch ||  || align=right | 4.5 km || 
|-id=350 bgcolor=#fefefe
| 502350 ||  || — || October 11, 2010 || Catalina || CSS ||  || align=right data-sort-value="0.59" | 590 m || 
|-id=351 bgcolor=#E9E9E9
| 502351 ||  || — || September 21, 2009 || Mount Lemmon || Mount Lemmon Survey ||  || align=right data-sort-value="0.79" | 790 m || 
|-id=352 bgcolor=#E9E9E9
| 502352 ||  || — || January 9, 2011 || Mount Lemmon || Mount Lemmon Survey || EUN || align=right | 1.0 km || 
|-id=353 bgcolor=#E9E9E9
| 502353 ||  || — || January 6, 2006 || Mount Lemmon || Mount Lemmon Survey || MRX || align=right data-sort-value="0.91" | 910 m || 
|-id=354 bgcolor=#E9E9E9
| 502354 ||  || — || December 27, 2005 || Kitt Peak || Spacewatch ||  || align=right | 3.2 km || 
|-id=355 bgcolor=#d6d6d6
| 502355 ||  || — || May 12, 2010 || WISE || WISE ||  || align=right | 3.6 km || 
|-id=356 bgcolor=#E9E9E9
| 502356 ||  || — || December 17, 2009 || Kitt Peak || Spacewatch || AGN || align=right | 1.2 km || 
|-id=357 bgcolor=#E9E9E9
| 502357 ||  || — || December 5, 2005 || Mount Lemmon || Mount Lemmon Survey || WIT || align=right | 2.0 km || 
|-id=358 bgcolor=#d6d6d6
| 502358 ||  || — || October 11, 2007 || Kitt Peak || Spacewatch ||  || align=right | 3.6 km || 
|-id=359 bgcolor=#E9E9E9
| 502359 ||  || — || August 23, 2004 || Kitt Peak || Spacewatch ||  || align=right | 1.8 km || 
|-id=360 bgcolor=#E9E9E9
| 502360 ||  || — || December 26, 2014 || Haleakala || Pan-STARRS || HOF || align=right | 2.2 km || 
|-id=361 bgcolor=#E9E9E9
| 502361 ||  || — || November 26, 2009 || Mount Lemmon || Mount Lemmon Survey || MRX || align=right data-sort-value="0.96" | 960 m || 
|-id=362 bgcolor=#fefefe
| 502362 ||  || — || October 16, 1995 || Kitt Peak || Spacewatch ||  || align=right data-sort-value="0.41" | 410 m || 
|-id=363 bgcolor=#E9E9E9
| 502363 ||  || — || September 17, 2009 || Kitt Peak || Spacewatch ||  || align=right | 1.2 km || 
|-id=364 bgcolor=#d6d6d6
| 502364 ||  || — || November 21, 2008 || Mount Lemmon || Mount Lemmon Survey ||  || align=right | 2.5 km || 
|-id=365 bgcolor=#E9E9E9
| 502365 ||  || — || September 6, 2008 || Mount Lemmon || Mount Lemmon Survey || EUN || align=right | 1.4 km || 
|-id=366 bgcolor=#E9E9E9
| 502366 ||  || — || December 6, 2005 || Kitt Peak || Spacewatch ||  || align=right | 1.5 km || 
|-id=367 bgcolor=#d6d6d6
| 502367 ||  || — || June 12, 2012 || Kitt Peak || Spacewatch ||  || align=right | 3.1 km || 
|-id=368 bgcolor=#fefefe
| 502368 ||  || — || November 18, 2006 || Kitt Peak || Spacewatch ||  || align=right data-sort-value="0.66" | 660 m || 
|-id=369 bgcolor=#E9E9E9
| 502369 ||  || — || January 8, 2006 || Mount Lemmon || Mount Lemmon Survey ||  || align=right | 2.1 km || 
|-id=370 bgcolor=#fefefe
| 502370 ||  || — || February 10, 2008 || Kitt Peak || Spacewatch ||  || align=right data-sort-value="0.66" | 660 m || 
|-id=371 bgcolor=#E9E9E9
| 502371 ||  || — || May 21, 2012 || Mount Lemmon || Mount Lemmon Survey ||  || align=right | 1.7 km || 
|-id=372 bgcolor=#E9E9E9
| 502372 ||  || — || January 6, 2006 || Kitt Peak || Spacewatch ||  || align=right | 1.6 km || 
|-id=373 bgcolor=#E9E9E9
| 502373 ||  || — || August 20, 2009 || Kitt Peak || Spacewatch ||  || align=right data-sort-value="0.80" | 800 m || 
|-id=374 bgcolor=#E9E9E9
| 502374 ||  || — || February 21, 2007 || Mount Lemmon || Mount Lemmon Survey ||  || align=right data-sort-value="0.97" | 970 m || 
|-id=375 bgcolor=#E9E9E9
| 502375 ||  || — || March 31, 2011 || Haleakala || Pan-STARRS ||  || align=right | 2.0 km || 
|-id=376 bgcolor=#fefefe
| 502376 ||  || — || December 18, 2003 || Socorro || LINEAR ||  || align=right data-sort-value="0.80" | 800 m || 
|-id=377 bgcolor=#E9E9E9
| 502377 ||  || — || March 4, 2011 || Mount Lemmon || Mount Lemmon Survey ||  || align=right | 1.5 km || 
|-id=378 bgcolor=#E9E9E9
| 502378 ||  || — || January 13, 2010 || WISE || WISE ||  || align=right | 3.0 km || 
|-id=379 bgcolor=#E9E9E9
| 502379 ||  || — || January 5, 2006 || Kitt Peak || Spacewatch ||  || align=right | 1.7 km || 
|-id=380 bgcolor=#d6d6d6
| 502380 ||  || — || September 19, 2012 || Mount Lemmon || Mount Lemmon Survey ||  || align=right | 2.4 km || 
|-id=381 bgcolor=#E9E9E9
| 502381 ||  || — || September 4, 2008 || Kitt Peak || Spacewatch || HOF || align=right | 2.6 km || 
|-id=382 bgcolor=#fefefe
| 502382 ||  || — || November 17, 2006 || Mount Lemmon || Mount Lemmon Survey ||  || align=right data-sort-value="0.72" | 720 m || 
|-id=383 bgcolor=#E9E9E9
| 502383 ||  || — || June 16, 2012 || Mount Lemmon || Mount Lemmon Survey ||  || align=right | 1.6 km || 
|-id=384 bgcolor=#fefefe
| 502384 ||  || — || January 16, 2004 || Kitt Peak || Spacewatch ||  || align=right data-sort-value="0.64" | 640 m || 
|-id=385 bgcolor=#E9E9E9
| 502385 ||  || — || September 23, 2008 || Kitt Peak || Spacewatch || AGN || align=right data-sort-value="0.97" | 970 m || 
|-id=386 bgcolor=#fefefe
| 502386 ||  || — || February 7, 2008 || Kitt Peak || Spacewatch ||  || align=right data-sort-value="0.75" | 750 m || 
|-id=387 bgcolor=#d6d6d6
| 502387 ||  || — || August 13, 2012 || Haleakala || Pan-STARRS || EOS || align=right | 1.8 km || 
|-id=388 bgcolor=#fefefe
| 502388 ||  || — || August 12, 2013 || Haleakala || Pan-STARRS ||  || align=right data-sort-value="0.68" | 680 m || 
|-id=389 bgcolor=#E9E9E9
| 502389 ||  || — || February 1, 2006 || Mount Lemmon || Mount Lemmon Survey ||  || align=right | 1.6 km || 
|-id=390 bgcolor=#E9E9E9
| 502390 ||  || — || December 2, 2005 || Mount Lemmon || Mount Lemmon Survey ||  || align=right | 1.9 km || 
|-id=391 bgcolor=#d6d6d6
| 502391 ||  || — || August 19, 2006 || Anderson Mesa || LONEOS ||  || align=right | 3.3 km || 
|-id=392 bgcolor=#d6d6d6
| 502392 ||  || — || October 3, 2013 || Mount Lemmon || Mount Lemmon Survey || EOS || align=right | 1.9 km || 
|-id=393 bgcolor=#E9E9E9
| 502393 ||  || — || September 17, 2009 || Mount Lemmon || Mount Lemmon Survey ||  || align=right | 1.3 km || 
|-id=394 bgcolor=#E9E9E9
| 502394 ||  || — || November 4, 2004 || Kitt Peak || Spacewatch ||  || align=right | 1.9 km || 
|-id=395 bgcolor=#E9E9E9
| 502395 ||  || — || October 25, 2005 || Mount Lemmon || Mount Lemmon Survey ||  || align=right | 1.2 km || 
|-id=396 bgcolor=#E9E9E9
| 502396 ||  || — || January 27, 2007 || Kitt Peak || Spacewatch ||  || align=right data-sort-value="0.75" | 750 m || 
|-id=397 bgcolor=#E9E9E9
| 502397 ||  || — || October 3, 2013 || Haleakala || Pan-STARRS ||  || align=right | 2.0 km || 
|-id=398 bgcolor=#fefefe
| 502398 ||  || — || September 25, 2006 || Mount Lemmon || Mount Lemmon Survey || MAS || align=right data-sort-value="0.63" | 630 m || 
|-id=399 bgcolor=#E9E9E9
| 502399 ||  || — || August 22, 2004 || Kitt Peak || Spacewatch ||  || align=right | 1.4 km || 
|-id=400 bgcolor=#fefefe
| 502400 ||  || — || September 2, 2010 || Mount Lemmon || Mount Lemmon Survey ||  || align=right data-sort-value="0.50" | 500 m || 
|}

502401–502500 

|-bgcolor=#d6d6d6
| 502401 ||  || — || February 17, 2004 || Kitt Peak || Spacewatch ||  || align=right | 2.4 km || 
|-id=402 bgcolor=#fefefe
| 502402 ||  || — || September 2, 2013 || Mount Lemmon || Mount Lemmon Survey ||  || align=right data-sort-value="0.73" | 730 m || 
|-id=403 bgcolor=#E9E9E9
| 502403 ||  || — || April 24, 2007 || Kitt Peak || Spacewatch ||  || align=right | 1.5 km || 
|-id=404 bgcolor=#E9E9E9
| 502404 ||  || — || December 11, 2004 || Kitt Peak || Spacewatch ||  || align=right | 2.5 km || 
|-id=405 bgcolor=#d6d6d6
| 502405 ||  || — || May 24, 2010 || WISE || WISE || EOS || align=right | 3.8 km || 
|-id=406 bgcolor=#E9E9E9
| 502406 ||  || — || March 13, 2011 || Mount Lemmon || Mount Lemmon Survey ||  || align=right | 2.0 km || 
|-id=407 bgcolor=#E9E9E9
| 502407 ||  || — || January 18, 2015 || Haleakala || Pan-STARRS ||  || align=right | 1.7 km || 
|-id=408 bgcolor=#E9E9E9
| 502408 ||  || — || April 23, 2011 || Haleakala || Pan-STARRS || AGN || align=right | 1.2 km || 
|-id=409 bgcolor=#E9E9E9
| 502409 ||  || — || October 9, 2004 || Kitt Peak || Spacewatch || NEM || align=right | 2.3 km || 
|-id=410 bgcolor=#E9E9E9
| 502410 ||  || — || July 29, 2008 || Mount Lemmon || Mount Lemmon Survey ||  || align=right | 2.0 km || 
|-id=411 bgcolor=#E9E9E9
| 502411 ||  || — || February 6, 2006 || Kitt Peak || Spacewatch ||  || align=right | 2.3 km || 
|-id=412 bgcolor=#d6d6d6
| 502412 ||  || — || May 8, 2006 || Mount Lemmon || Mount Lemmon Survey ||  || align=right | 3.2 km || 
|-id=413 bgcolor=#d6d6d6
| 502413 ||  || — || July 1, 2010 || WISE || WISE ||  || align=right | 2.4 km || 
|-id=414 bgcolor=#E9E9E9
| 502414 ||  || — || January 19, 2010 || WISE || WISE ||  || align=right | 2.1 km || 
|-id=415 bgcolor=#E9E9E9
| 502415 ||  || — || December 10, 2010 || Mount Lemmon || Mount Lemmon Survey ||  || align=right | 1.2 km || 
|-id=416 bgcolor=#d6d6d6
| 502416 ||  || — || October 5, 2013 || Catalina || CSS ||  || align=right | 3.3 km || 
|-id=417 bgcolor=#d6d6d6
| 502417 ||  || — || November 21, 2008 || Kitt Peak || Spacewatch ||  || align=right | 3.1 km || 
|-id=418 bgcolor=#d6d6d6
| 502418 ||  || — || August 13, 2012 || Haleakala || Pan-STARRS ||  || align=right | 2.5 km || 
|-id=419 bgcolor=#d6d6d6
| 502419 ||  || — || May 30, 2006 || Mount Lemmon || Mount Lemmon Survey || HYG || align=right | 3.0 km || 
|-id=420 bgcolor=#d6d6d6
| 502420 ||  || — || March 17, 2004 || Kitt Peak || Spacewatch ||  || align=right | 2.7 km || 
|-id=421 bgcolor=#E9E9E9
| 502421 ||  || — || August 25, 2004 || Kitt Peak || Spacewatch ||  || align=right | 3.0 km || 
|-id=422 bgcolor=#E9E9E9
| 502422 ||  || — || January 10, 2006 || Kitt Peak || Spacewatch ||  || align=right | 2.3 km || 
|-id=423 bgcolor=#d6d6d6
| 502423 ||  || — || September 9, 2007 || Kitt Peak || Spacewatch ||  || align=right | 4.6 km || 
|-id=424 bgcolor=#fefefe
| 502424 ||  || — || February 3, 2008 || Kitt Peak || Spacewatch ||  || align=right data-sort-value="0.66" | 660 m || 
|-id=425 bgcolor=#d6d6d6
| 502425 ||  || — || October 9, 2008 || Kitt Peak || Spacewatch ||  || align=right | 2.3 km || 
|-id=426 bgcolor=#fefefe
| 502426 ||  || — || September 21, 2003 || Kitt Peak || Spacewatch ||  || align=right data-sort-value="0.57" | 570 m || 
|-id=427 bgcolor=#E9E9E9
| 502427 ||  || — || June 18, 2012 || Mount Lemmon || Mount Lemmon Survey ||  || align=right | 2.0 km || 
|-id=428 bgcolor=#E9E9E9
| 502428 ||  || — || January 31, 2006 || Kitt Peak || Spacewatch ||  || align=right | 1.5 km || 
|-id=429 bgcolor=#d6d6d6
| 502429 ||  || — || April 28, 2011 || Haleakala || Pan-STARRS || EOS || align=right | 2.5 km || 
|-id=430 bgcolor=#E9E9E9
| 502430 ||  || — || November 27, 2009 || Mount Lemmon || Mount Lemmon Survey || MAR || align=right | 3.1 km || 
|-id=431 bgcolor=#fefefe
| 502431 ||  || — || December 13, 2010 || Mount Lemmon || Mount Lemmon Survey ||  || align=right data-sort-value="0.88" | 880 m || 
|-id=432 bgcolor=#fefefe
| 502432 ||  || — || January 30, 2004 || Kitt Peak || Spacewatch ||  || align=right data-sort-value="0.87" | 870 m || 
|-id=433 bgcolor=#E9E9E9
| 502433 ||  || — || November 25, 2013 || Haleakala || Pan-STARRS || AGN || align=right | 1.2 km || 
|-id=434 bgcolor=#E9E9E9
| 502434 ||  || — || January 28, 2007 || Mount Lemmon || Mount Lemmon Survey ||  || align=right | 1.5 km || 
|-id=435 bgcolor=#fefefe
| 502435 ||  || — || October 2, 2006 || Mount Lemmon || Mount Lemmon Survey ||  || align=right data-sort-value="0.62" | 620 m || 
|-id=436 bgcolor=#E9E9E9
| 502436 ||  || — || January 26, 2001 || Kitt Peak || Spacewatch || DOR || align=right | 2.1 km || 
|-id=437 bgcolor=#d6d6d6
| 502437 ||  || — || November 29, 2013 || Haleakala || Pan-STARRS || EOS || align=right | 3.1 km || 
|-id=438 bgcolor=#E9E9E9
| 502438 ||  || — || January 6, 2010 || Kitt Peak || Spacewatch || AGN || align=right | 1.0 km || 
|-id=439 bgcolor=#d6d6d6
| 502439 ||  || — || February 9, 2010 || Kitt Peak || Spacewatch || EOS || align=right | 1.9 km || 
|-id=440 bgcolor=#E9E9E9
| 502440 ||  || — || February 21, 2007 || Mount Lemmon || Mount Lemmon Survey ||  || align=right | 1.1 km || 
|-id=441 bgcolor=#d6d6d6
| 502441 ||  || — || June 27, 2011 || Mount Lemmon || Mount Lemmon Survey || LAU || align=right | 2.2 km || 
|-id=442 bgcolor=#fefefe
| 502442 ||  || — || February 6, 2007 || Mount Lemmon || Mount Lemmon Survey ||  || align=right data-sort-value="0.74" | 740 m || 
|-id=443 bgcolor=#d6d6d6
| 502443 ||  || — || January 12, 2010 || WISE || WISE ||  || align=right | 2.3 km || 
|-id=444 bgcolor=#E9E9E9
| 502444 ||  || — || January 30, 2006 || Kitt Peak || Spacewatch ||  || align=right | 1.9 km || 
|-id=445 bgcolor=#d6d6d6
| 502445 ||  || — || November 25, 2013 || Haleakala || Pan-STARRS ||  || align=right | 3.5 km || 
|-id=446 bgcolor=#d6d6d6
| 502446 ||  || — || March 17, 2005 || Kitt Peak || Spacewatch ||  || align=right | 2.3 km || 
|-id=447 bgcolor=#E9E9E9
| 502447 ||  || — || April 20, 2007 || Kitt Peak || Spacewatch ||  || align=right | 2.0 km || 
|-id=448 bgcolor=#d6d6d6
| 502448 ||  || — || January 19, 2015 || Kitt Peak || Spacewatch ||  || align=right | 3.3 km || 
|-id=449 bgcolor=#E9E9E9
| 502449 ||  || — || May 26, 2011 || Mount Lemmon || Mount Lemmon Survey || AGN || align=right | 1.2 km || 
|-id=450 bgcolor=#d6d6d6
| 502450 ||  || — || November 6, 2013 || Haleakala || Pan-STARRS || EOS || align=right | 1.7 km || 
|-id=451 bgcolor=#d6d6d6
| 502451 ||  || — || August 14, 2012 || Haleakala || Pan-STARRS ||  || align=right | 2.9 km || 
|-id=452 bgcolor=#d6d6d6
| 502452 ||  || — || October 10, 2007 || Catalina || CSS || EOS || align=right | 2.4 km || 
|-id=453 bgcolor=#d6d6d6
| 502453 ||  || — || December 30, 2008 || Catalina || CSS ||  || align=right | 3.2 km || 
|-id=454 bgcolor=#fefefe
| 502454 ||  || — || March 27, 2012 || Kitt Peak || Spacewatch ||  || align=right | 1.1 km || 
|-id=455 bgcolor=#d6d6d6
| 502455 ||  || — || October 24, 2008 || Mount Lemmon || Mount Lemmon Survey || URS || align=right | 4.1 km || 
|-id=456 bgcolor=#d6d6d6
| 502456 ||  || — || August 14, 2012 || Haleakala || Pan-STARRS ||  || align=right | 3.0 km || 
|-id=457 bgcolor=#E9E9E9
| 502457 ||  || — || September 24, 2008 || Kitt Peak || Spacewatch ||  || align=right | 2.2 km || 
|-id=458 bgcolor=#d6d6d6
| 502458 ||  || — || December 29, 2003 || Kitt Peak || Spacewatch ||  || align=right | 3.1 km || 
|-id=459 bgcolor=#E9E9E9
| 502459 ||  || — || January 19, 2015 || Haleakala || Pan-STARRS ||  || align=right | 2.0 km || 
|-id=460 bgcolor=#d6d6d6
| 502460 ||  || — || September 12, 2007 || Mount Lemmon || Mount Lemmon Survey ||  || align=right | 2.9 km || 
|-id=461 bgcolor=#d6d6d6
| 502461 ||  || — || June 8, 2011 || Mount Lemmon || Mount Lemmon Survey ||  || align=right | 3.6 km || 
|-id=462 bgcolor=#d6d6d6
| 502462 ||  || — || May 9, 2010 || WISE || WISE ||  || align=right | 3.4 km || 
|-id=463 bgcolor=#fefefe
| 502463 ||  || — || March 7, 2008 || Kitt Peak || Spacewatch ||  || align=right data-sort-value="0.96" | 960 m || 
|-id=464 bgcolor=#fefefe
| 502464 ||  || — || November 29, 2003 || Kitt Peak || Spacewatch || NYS || align=right data-sort-value="0.54" | 540 m || 
|-id=465 bgcolor=#E9E9E9
| 502465 ||  || — || February 2, 2006 || Mount Lemmon || Mount Lemmon Survey || AGN || align=right | 1.3 km || 
|-id=466 bgcolor=#E9E9E9
| 502466 ||  || — || January 16, 2015 || Haleakala || Pan-STARRS || WAT || align=right | 2.8 km || 
|-id=467 bgcolor=#E9E9E9
| 502467 ||  || — || March 3, 2006 || Kitt Peak || Spacewatch || HOF || align=right | 2.3 km || 
|-id=468 bgcolor=#d6d6d6
| 502468 ||  || — || September 13, 2007 || Kitt Peak || Spacewatch ||  || align=right | 2.2 km || 
|-id=469 bgcolor=#E9E9E9
| 502469 ||  || — || October 1, 2013 || Kitt Peak || Spacewatch ||  || align=right | 1.1 km || 
|-id=470 bgcolor=#fefefe
| 502470 ||  || — || October 20, 2006 || Kitt Peak || Spacewatch || NYS || align=right data-sort-value="0.49" | 490 m || 
|-id=471 bgcolor=#fefefe
| 502471 ||  || — || November 25, 2006 || Kitt Peak || Spacewatch ||  || align=right data-sort-value="0.73" | 730 m || 
|-id=472 bgcolor=#fefefe
| 502472 ||  || — || December 24, 2006 || Kitt Peak || Spacewatch ||  || align=right data-sort-value="0.68" | 680 m || 
|-id=473 bgcolor=#d6d6d6
| 502473 ||  || — || October 10, 2007 || Mount Lemmon || Mount Lemmon Survey || URS || align=right | 4.2 km || 
|-id=474 bgcolor=#d6d6d6
| 502474 ||  || — || June 4, 2005 || Kitt Peak || Spacewatch || VER || align=right | 2.7 km || 
|-id=475 bgcolor=#E9E9E9
| 502475 ||  || — || January 26, 2011 || Mount Lemmon || Mount Lemmon Survey ||  || align=right data-sort-value="0.99" | 990 m || 
|-id=476 bgcolor=#d6d6d6
| 502476 ||  || — || November 1, 2013 || Mount Lemmon || Mount Lemmon Survey ||  || align=right | 2.5 km || 
|-id=477 bgcolor=#d6d6d6
| 502477 ||  || — || June 26, 2010 || WISE || WISE ||  || align=right | 4.7 km || 
|-id=478 bgcolor=#d6d6d6
| 502478 ||  || — || November 10, 2013 || Mount Lemmon || Mount Lemmon Survey ||  || align=right | 1.9 km || 
|-id=479 bgcolor=#E9E9E9
| 502479 ||  || — || September 25, 2009 || Catalina || CSS ||  || align=right | 1.8 km || 
|-id=480 bgcolor=#E9E9E9
| 502480 ||  || — || January 30, 2011 || Haleakala || Pan-STARRS ||  || align=right data-sort-value="0.60" | 600 m || 
|-id=481 bgcolor=#d6d6d6
| 502481 ||  || — || February 16, 2010 || Kitt Peak || Spacewatch ||  || align=right | 3.6 km || 
|-id=482 bgcolor=#E9E9E9
| 502482 ||  || — || September 29, 2008 || Kitt Peak || Spacewatch || AST || align=right | 1.7 km || 
|-id=483 bgcolor=#d6d6d6
| 502483 ||  || — || September 24, 2008 || Kitt Peak || Spacewatch || KOR || align=right | 1.9 km || 
|-id=484 bgcolor=#d6d6d6
| 502484 ||  || — || January 27, 2010 || WISE || WISE ||  || align=right | 4.7 km || 
|-id=485 bgcolor=#fefefe
| 502485 ||  || — || September 30, 2006 || Catalina || CSS ||  || align=right data-sort-value="0.75" | 750 m || 
|-id=486 bgcolor=#d6d6d6
| 502486 ||  || — || February 14, 2004 || Kitt Peak || Spacewatch ||  || align=right | 2.9 km || 
|-id=487 bgcolor=#d6d6d6
| 502487 ||  || — || January 19, 2015 || Kitt Peak || Spacewatch ||  || align=right | 3.1 km || 
|-id=488 bgcolor=#E9E9E9
| 502488 ||  || — || February 1, 2006 || Kitt Peak || Spacewatch ||  || align=right | 2.0 km || 
|-id=489 bgcolor=#d6d6d6
| 502489 ||  || — || May 10, 2005 || Kitt Peak || Spacewatch ||  || align=right | 2.2 km || 
|-id=490 bgcolor=#E9E9E9
| 502490 ||  || — || October 6, 1999 || Kitt Peak || Spacewatch || AGN || align=right | 1.3 km || 
|-id=491 bgcolor=#d6d6d6
| 502491 ||  || — || February 6, 2010 || Kitt Peak || Spacewatch || EOS || align=right | 2.1 km || 
|-id=492 bgcolor=#E9E9E9
| 502492 ||  || — || March 31, 2011 || Haleakala || Pan-STARRS ||  || align=right | 2.2 km || 
|-id=493 bgcolor=#E9E9E9
| 502493 ||  || — || October 3, 2013 || Haleakala || Pan-STARRS || AGN || align=right | 1.1 km || 
|-id=494 bgcolor=#E9E9E9
| 502494 ||  || — || March 13, 2011 || Kitt Peak || Spacewatch || HOF || align=right | 2.3 km || 
|-id=495 bgcolor=#d6d6d6
| 502495 ||  || — || January 30, 2011 || Haleakala || Pan-STARRS ||  || align=right | 3.1 km || 
|-id=496 bgcolor=#fefefe
| 502496 ||  || — || October 31, 2010 || Mount Lemmon || Mount Lemmon Survey ||  || align=right data-sort-value="0.68" | 680 m || 
|-id=497 bgcolor=#d6d6d6
| 502497 ||  || — || September 12, 2007 || Mount Lemmon || Mount Lemmon Survey ||  || align=right | 2.3 km || 
|-id=498 bgcolor=#E9E9E9
| 502498 ||  || — || March 30, 2011 || Mount Lemmon || Mount Lemmon Survey ||  || align=right | 2.2 km || 
|-id=499 bgcolor=#E9E9E9
| 502499 ||  || — || October 24, 2009 || Kitt Peak || Spacewatch ||  || align=right | 1.1 km || 
|-id=500 bgcolor=#fefefe
| 502500 ||  || — || December 3, 2010 || Kitt Peak || Spacewatch || MAS || align=right data-sort-value="0.64" | 640 m || 
|}

502501–502600 

|-bgcolor=#E9E9E9
| 502501 ||  || — || August 20, 2004 || Kitt Peak || Spacewatch ||  || align=right | 1.5 km || 
|-id=502 bgcolor=#d6d6d6
| 502502 ||  || — || January 20, 2015 || Haleakala || Pan-STARRS ||  || align=right | 2.8 km || 
|-id=503 bgcolor=#fefefe
| 502503 ||  || — || August 16, 2009 || Kitt Peak || Spacewatch || V || align=right data-sort-value="0.64" | 640 m || 
|-id=504 bgcolor=#E9E9E9
| 502504 ||  || — || October 7, 2004 || Kitt Peak || Spacewatch ||  || align=right | 1.7 km || 
|-id=505 bgcolor=#d6d6d6
| 502505 ||  || — || August 26, 2012 || Haleakala || Pan-STARRS ||  || align=right | 2.8 km || 
|-id=506 bgcolor=#E9E9E9
| 502506 ||  || — || December 20, 2009 || Kitt Peak || Spacewatch ||  || align=right | 2.3 km || 
|-id=507 bgcolor=#d6d6d6
| 502507 ||  || — || August 26, 2012 || Haleakala || Pan-STARRS ||  || align=right | 2.9 km || 
|-id=508 bgcolor=#d6d6d6
| 502508 ||  || — || September 4, 2007 || Mount Lemmon || Mount Lemmon Survey || KOR || align=right | 2.5 km || 
|-id=509 bgcolor=#E9E9E9
| 502509 ||  || — || January 21, 2002 || Kitt Peak || Spacewatch || MIS || align=right | 1.3 km || 
|-id=510 bgcolor=#E9E9E9
| 502510 ||  || — || September 13, 2013 || Catalina || CSS || EUN || align=right data-sort-value="0.95" | 950 m || 
|-id=511 bgcolor=#E9E9E9
| 502511 ||  || — || September 7, 2008 || Mount Lemmon || Mount Lemmon Survey ||  || align=right | 2.2 km || 
|-id=512 bgcolor=#d6d6d6
| 502512 ||  || — || January 20, 2015 || Haleakala || Pan-STARRS ||  || align=right | 2.0 km || 
|-id=513 bgcolor=#d6d6d6
| 502513 ||  || — || March 18, 2010 || Mount Lemmon || Mount Lemmon Survey ||  || align=right | 2.3 km || 
|-id=514 bgcolor=#d6d6d6
| 502514 ||  || — || September 14, 2007 || Kitt Peak || Spacewatch ||  || align=right | 2.2 km || 
|-id=515 bgcolor=#d6d6d6
| 502515 ||  || — || November 20, 2007 || Mount Lemmon || Mount Lemmon Survey ||  || align=right | 3.1 km || 
|-id=516 bgcolor=#E9E9E9
| 502516 ||  || — || March 14, 2007 || Mount Lemmon || Mount Lemmon Survey || (5) || align=right data-sort-value="0.80" | 800 m || 
|-id=517 bgcolor=#d6d6d6
| 502517 ||  || — || December 30, 2008 || Kitt Peak || Spacewatch ||  || align=right | 3.4 km || 
|-id=518 bgcolor=#d6d6d6
| 502518 ||  || — || June 10, 2010 || WISE || WISE ||  || align=right | 2.5 km || 
|-id=519 bgcolor=#E9E9E9
| 502519 ||  || — || January 23, 2006 || Kitt Peak || Spacewatch ||  || align=right | 4.0 km || 
|-id=520 bgcolor=#E9E9E9
| 502520 ||  || — || March 4, 2006 || Mount Lemmon || Mount Lemmon Survey ||  || align=right | 1.7 km || 
|-id=521 bgcolor=#E9E9E9
| 502521 ||  || — || December 18, 2009 || Kitt Peak || Spacewatch || HOF || align=right | 2.4 km || 
|-id=522 bgcolor=#E9E9E9
| 502522 ||  || — || March 2, 2006 || Kitt Peak || Spacewatch ||  || align=right | 1.8 km || 
|-id=523 bgcolor=#E9E9E9
| 502523 ||  || — || February 25, 2006 || Kitt Peak || Spacewatch || AGN || align=right | 1.3 km || 
|-id=524 bgcolor=#d6d6d6
| 502524 ||  || — || January 20, 2015 || Haleakala || Pan-STARRS ||  || align=right | 2.8 km || 
|-id=525 bgcolor=#E9E9E9
| 502525 ||  || — || September 15, 2009 || Kitt Peak || Spacewatch ||  || align=right data-sort-value="0.79" | 790 m || 
|-id=526 bgcolor=#E9E9E9
| 502526 ||  || — || October 17, 2008 || Kitt Peak || Spacewatch || AGN || align=right | 1.2 km || 
|-id=527 bgcolor=#E9E9E9
| 502527 ||  || — || February 4, 2006 || Kitt Peak || Spacewatch ||  || align=right | 1.6 km || 
|-id=528 bgcolor=#d6d6d6
| 502528 ||  || — || November 28, 2013 || Mount Lemmon || Mount Lemmon Survey ||  || align=right | 1.9 km || 
|-id=529 bgcolor=#d6d6d6
| 502529 ||  || — || September 10, 2007 || Mount Lemmon || Mount Lemmon Survey ||  || align=right | 1.9 km || 
|-id=530 bgcolor=#E9E9E9
| 502530 ||  || — || December 18, 2009 || Kitt Peak || Spacewatch ||  || align=right | 1.8 km || 
|-id=531 bgcolor=#d6d6d6
| 502531 ||  || — || August 26, 2012 || Haleakala || Pan-STARRS || EOS || align=right | 1.7 km || 
|-id=532 bgcolor=#E9E9E9
| 502532 ||  || — || February 25, 2006 || Mount Lemmon || Mount Lemmon Survey ||  || align=right | 1.8 km || 
|-id=533 bgcolor=#d6d6d6
| 502533 ||  || — || November 8, 2007 || Mount Lemmon || Mount Lemmon Survey ||  || align=right | 3.2 km || 
|-id=534 bgcolor=#d6d6d6
| 502534 ||  || — || February 14, 2005 || Kitt Peak || Spacewatch ||  || align=right | 2.0 km || 
|-id=535 bgcolor=#E9E9E9
| 502535 ||  || — || September 6, 2008 || Mount Lemmon || Mount Lemmon Survey ||  || align=right | 1.9 km || 
|-id=536 bgcolor=#d6d6d6
| 502536 ||  || — || February 14, 2010 || Mount Lemmon || Mount Lemmon Survey ||  || align=right | 2.5 km || 
|-id=537 bgcolor=#E9E9E9
| 502537 ||  || — || January 6, 2010 || Kitt Peak || Spacewatch || HOF || align=right | 2.9 km || 
|-id=538 bgcolor=#E9E9E9
| 502538 ||  || — || November 6, 2013 || Haleakala || Pan-STARRS ||  || align=right | 1.3 km || 
|-id=539 bgcolor=#E9E9E9
| 502539 ||  || — || October 21, 2009 || Mount Lemmon || Mount Lemmon Survey ||  || align=right | 1.2 km || 
|-id=540 bgcolor=#d6d6d6
| 502540 ||  || — || December 30, 2008 || Kitt Peak || Spacewatch || VER || align=right | 2.5 km || 
|-id=541 bgcolor=#d6d6d6
| 502541 ||  || — || December 4, 2008 || Mount Lemmon || Mount Lemmon Survey ||  || align=right | 2.3 km || 
|-id=542 bgcolor=#E9E9E9
| 502542 ||  || — || December 18, 2009 || Mount Lemmon || Mount Lemmon Survey || AGN || align=right | 1.1 km || 
|-id=543 bgcolor=#fefefe
| 502543 ||  || — || October 23, 2006 || Mount Lemmon || Mount Lemmon Survey || NYS || align=right data-sort-value="0.67" | 670 m || 
|-id=544 bgcolor=#d6d6d6
| 502544 ||  || — || March 15, 2010 || Mount Lemmon || Mount Lemmon Survey || EOS || align=right | 1.5 km || 
|-id=545 bgcolor=#E9E9E9
| 502545 ||  || — || December 3, 2005 || Kitt Peak || Spacewatch ||  || align=right | 1.1 km || 
|-id=546 bgcolor=#E9E9E9
| 502546 ||  || — || December 27, 2005 || Kitt Peak || Spacewatch ||  || align=right | 1.6 km || 
|-id=547 bgcolor=#d6d6d6
| 502547 ||  || — || November 6, 2013 || Haleakala || Pan-STARRS ||  || align=right | 2.0 km || 
|-id=548 bgcolor=#E9E9E9
| 502548 ||  || — || September 21, 2008 || Mount Lemmon || Mount Lemmon Survey || HNS || align=right | 2.2 km || 
|-id=549 bgcolor=#E9E9E9
| 502549 ||  || — || December 18, 2009 || Mount Lemmon || Mount Lemmon Survey ||  || align=right | 2.1 km || 
|-id=550 bgcolor=#E9E9E9
| 502550 ||  || — || December 26, 2009 || Kitt Peak || Spacewatch ||  || align=right | 2.3 km || 
|-id=551 bgcolor=#E9E9E9
| 502551 ||  || — || March 14, 2011 || Mount Lemmon || Mount Lemmon Survey ||  || align=right | 1.4 km || 
|-id=552 bgcolor=#d6d6d6
| 502552 ||  || — || February 15, 2010 || WISE || WISE ||  || align=right | 5.0 km || 
|-id=553 bgcolor=#E9E9E9
| 502553 ||  || — || November 18, 2009 || Mount Lemmon || Mount Lemmon Survey || WIT || align=right | 1.3 km || 
|-id=554 bgcolor=#d6d6d6
| 502554 ||  || — || September 18, 2006 || Kitt Peak || Spacewatch ||  || align=right | 2.8 km || 
|-id=555 bgcolor=#E9E9E9
| 502555 ||  || — || September 5, 2008 || Kitt Peak || Spacewatch ||  || align=right | 2.1 km || 
|-id=556 bgcolor=#fefefe
| 502556 ||  || — || August 9, 2013 || Kitt Peak || Spacewatch ||  || align=right data-sort-value="0.87" | 870 m || 
|-id=557 bgcolor=#E9E9E9
| 502557 ||  || — || February 1, 2006 || Kitt Peak || Spacewatch || WIT || align=right | 1.8 km || 
|-id=558 bgcolor=#E9E9E9
| 502558 ||  || — || October 18, 2009 || Mount Lemmon || Mount Lemmon Survey ||  || align=right | 1.2 km || 
|-id=559 bgcolor=#d6d6d6
| 502559 ||  || — || September 12, 2007 || Mount Lemmon || Mount Lemmon Survey ||  || align=right | 2.1 km || 
|-id=560 bgcolor=#d6d6d6
| 502560 ||  || — || June 21, 2007 || Mount Lemmon || Mount Lemmon Survey || KOR || align=right | 1.4 km || 
|-id=561 bgcolor=#E9E9E9
| 502561 ||  || — || October 31, 1999 || Kitt Peak || Spacewatch ||  || align=right | 2.0 km || 
|-id=562 bgcolor=#fefefe
| 502562 ||  || — || October 17, 1995 || Kitt Peak || Spacewatch || MAS || align=right data-sort-value="0.58" | 580 m || 
|-id=563 bgcolor=#fefefe
| 502563 ||  || — || December 7, 2010 || Mount Lemmon || Mount Lemmon Survey ||  || align=right data-sort-value="0.83" | 830 m || 
|-id=564 bgcolor=#d6d6d6
| 502564 ||  || — || December 31, 2008 || Kitt Peak || Spacewatch || LIX || align=right | 5.1 km || 
|-id=565 bgcolor=#E9E9E9
| 502565 ||  || — || February 4, 2006 || Kitt Peak || Spacewatch ||  || align=right | 2.1 km || 
|-id=566 bgcolor=#E9E9E9
| 502566 ||  || — || March 2, 2006 || Kitt Peak || Spacewatch || AGN || align=right | 1.1 km || 
|-id=567 bgcolor=#E9E9E9
| 502567 ||  || — || April 5, 2011 || Mount Lemmon || Mount Lemmon Survey ||  || align=right | 1.7 km || 
|-id=568 bgcolor=#E9E9E9
| 502568 ||  || — || September 28, 2013 || Mount Lemmon || Mount Lemmon Survey ||  || align=right | 1.2 km || 
|-id=569 bgcolor=#E9E9E9
| 502569 ||  || — || February 2, 2006 || Kitt Peak || Spacewatch ||  || align=right | 1.6 km || 
|-id=570 bgcolor=#E9E9E9
| 502570 ||  || — || November 17, 2009 || Mount Lemmon || Mount Lemmon Survey ||  || align=right | 1.2 km || 
|-id=571 bgcolor=#d6d6d6
| 502571 ||  || — || September 24, 2008 || Mount Lemmon || Mount Lemmon Survey || KOR || align=right | 1.3 km || 
|-id=572 bgcolor=#E9E9E9
| 502572 ||  || — || February 28, 2006 || Mount Lemmon || Mount Lemmon Survey ||  || align=right | 1.6 km || 
|-id=573 bgcolor=#E9E9E9
| 502573 ||  || — || October 6, 2004 || Kitt Peak || Spacewatch || HOF  WIT || align=right | 2.1 km || 
|-id=574 bgcolor=#E9E9E9
| 502574 ||  || — || November 3, 2000 || Kitt Peak || Spacewatch ||  || align=right | 1.3 km || 
|-id=575 bgcolor=#d6d6d6
| 502575 ||  || — || August 17, 2012 || Haleakala || Pan-STARRS || EOS || align=right | 2.2 km || 
|-id=576 bgcolor=#d6d6d6
| 502576 ||  || — || February 5, 2010 || Kitt Peak || Spacewatch ||  || align=right | 3.5 km || 
|-id=577 bgcolor=#E9E9E9
| 502577 ||  || — || September 28, 2008 || Mount Lemmon || Mount Lemmon Survey || WIT || align=right | 1.9 km || 
|-id=578 bgcolor=#d6d6d6
| 502578 ||  || — || April 15, 2011 || Haleakala || Pan-STARRS || KOR || align=right | 1.2 km || 
|-id=579 bgcolor=#FA8072
| 502579 ||  || — || October 5, 2010 || Siding Spring || SSS ||  || align=right | 1.1 km || 
|-id=580 bgcolor=#E9E9E9
| 502580 ||  || — || November 16, 2006 || Kitt Peak || Spacewatch ||  || align=right | 1.4 km || 
|-id=581 bgcolor=#fefefe
| 502581 ||  || — || August 26, 2013 || Haleakala || Pan-STARRS ||  || align=right data-sort-value="0.97" | 970 m || 
|-id=582 bgcolor=#d6d6d6
| 502582 ||  || — || June 8, 2011 || Mount Lemmon || Mount Lemmon Survey ||  || align=right | 3.1 km || 
|-id=583 bgcolor=#fefefe
| 502583 ||  || — || January 23, 2011 || Mount Lemmon || Mount Lemmon Survey ||  || align=right data-sort-value="0.71" | 710 m || 
|-id=584 bgcolor=#E9E9E9
| 502584 ||  || — || September 25, 2008 || Mount Lemmon || Mount Lemmon Survey ||  || align=right | 2.3 km || 
|-id=585 bgcolor=#E9E9E9
| 502585 ||  || — || May 11, 2007 || Mount Lemmon || Mount Lemmon Survey || WIT || align=right | 2.3 km || 
|-id=586 bgcolor=#E9E9E9
| 502586 ||  || — || March 13, 2011 || Kitt Peak || Spacewatch ||  || align=right | 2.1 km || 
|-id=587 bgcolor=#d6d6d6
| 502587 ||  || — || January 19, 2004 || Kitt Peak || Spacewatch || URS || align=right | 3.3 km || 
|-id=588 bgcolor=#E9E9E9
| 502588 ||  || — || November 30, 2005 || Kitt Peak || Spacewatch ||  || align=right | 1.9 km || 
|-id=589 bgcolor=#E9E9E9
| 502589 ||  || — || March 6, 2011 || Kitt Peak || Spacewatch ||  || align=right | 1.9 km || 
|-id=590 bgcolor=#d6d6d6
| 502590 ||  || — || August 10, 2007 || Kitt Peak || Spacewatch || KOR || align=right | 2.2 km || 
|-id=591 bgcolor=#d6d6d6
| 502591 ||  || — || August 26, 2012 || Haleakala || Pan-STARRS || VER || align=right | 3.4 km || 
|-id=592 bgcolor=#d6d6d6
| 502592 ||  || — || January 14, 2010 || WISE || WISE ||  || align=right | 2.9 km || 
|-id=593 bgcolor=#E9E9E9
| 502593 ||  || — || December 19, 2009 || Kitt Peak || Spacewatch || AGN || align=right | 1.7 km || 
|-id=594 bgcolor=#d6d6d6
| 502594 ||  || — || November 2, 2013 || Mount Lemmon || Mount Lemmon Survey || HYG || align=right | 2.8 km || 
|-id=595 bgcolor=#d6d6d6
| 502595 ||  || — || August 29, 2005 || Kitt Peak || Spacewatch || SYL7:4 || align=right | 3.3 km || 
|-id=596 bgcolor=#fefefe
| 502596 ||  || — || October 16, 2006 || Kitt Peak || Spacewatch ||  || align=right data-sort-value="0.58" | 580 m || 
|-id=597 bgcolor=#d6d6d6
| 502597 ||  || — || January 3, 2009 || Kitt Peak || Spacewatch || THM || align=right | 2.6 km || 
|-id=598 bgcolor=#d6d6d6
| 502598 ||  || — || February 14, 2010 || Mount Lemmon || Mount Lemmon Survey ||  || align=right | 2.4 km || 
|-id=599 bgcolor=#d6d6d6
| 502599 ||  || — || April 11, 2005 || Mount Lemmon || Mount Lemmon Survey ||  || align=right | 2.8 km || 
|-id=600 bgcolor=#E9E9E9
| 502600 ||  || — || September 17, 2004 || Kitt Peak || Spacewatch || NEM || align=right | 1.8 km || 
|}

502601–502700 

|-bgcolor=#E9E9E9
| 502601 ||  || — || September 22, 2008 || Kitt Peak || Spacewatch ||  || align=right | 2.2 km || 
|-id=602 bgcolor=#d6d6d6
| 502602 ||  || — || November 29, 2013 || Haleakala || Pan-STARRS ||  || align=right | 3.2 km || 
|-id=603 bgcolor=#E9E9E9
| 502603 ||  || — || December 28, 2005 || Kitt Peak || Spacewatch ||  || align=right | 1.4 km || 
|-id=604 bgcolor=#d6d6d6
| 502604 ||  || — || April 4, 2005 || Mount Lemmon || Mount Lemmon Survey ||  || align=right | 2.4 km || 
|-id=605 bgcolor=#E9E9E9
| 502605 ||  || — || January 22, 2010 || WISE || WISE || BRU || align=right | 3.2 km || 
|-id=606 bgcolor=#d6d6d6
| 502606 ||  || — || October 4, 2007 || Kitt Peak || Spacewatch || HYG || align=right | 3.5 km || 
|-id=607 bgcolor=#E9E9E9
| 502607 ||  || — || August 24, 2008 || Kitt Peak || Spacewatch ||  || align=right | 2.5 km || 
|-id=608 bgcolor=#d6d6d6
| 502608 ||  || — || September 9, 2007 || Kitt Peak || Spacewatch || EOS || align=right | 3.0 km || 
|-id=609 bgcolor=#d6d6d6
| 502609 ||  || — || January 13, 2010 || WISE || WISE || EUP || align=right | 3.5 km || 
|-id=610 bgcolor=#E9E9E9
| 502610 ||  || — || September 5, 2008 || Kitt Peak || Spacewatch || WIT || align=right | 2.2 km || 
|-id=611 bgcolor=#E9E9E9
| 502611 ||  || — || February 2, 2006 || Kitt Peak || Spacewatch ||  || align=right | 2.6 km || 
|-id=612 bgcolor=#fefefe
| 502612 ||  || — || December 8, 1999 || Kitt Peak || Spacewatch ||  || align=right data-sort-value="0.63" | 630 m || 
|-id=613 bgcolor=#d6d6d6
| 502613 ||  || — || June 12, 2010 || WISE || WISE || EUP || align=right | 4.1 km || 
|-id=614 bgcolor=#E9E9E9
| 502614 ||  || — || January 31, 2006 || Kitt Peak || Spacewatch || WIT || align=right | 1.6 km || 
|-id=615 bgcolor=#E9E9E9
| 502615 ||  || — || September 7, 2004 || Kitt Peak || Spacewatch ||  || align=right | 1.1 km || 
|-id=616 bgcolor=#E9E9E9
| 502616 ||  || — || February 10, 2011 || Mount Lemmon || Mount Lemmon Survey ||  || align=right | 1.3 km || 
|-id=617 bgcolor=#fefefe
| 502617 ||  || — || February 11, 2008 || Mount Lemmon || Mount Lemmon Survey ||  || align=right data-sort-value="0.89" | 890 m || 
|-id=618 bgcolor=#d6d6d6
| 502618 ||  || — || April 2, 2005 || Kitt Peak || Spacewatch ||  || align=right | 2.4 km || 
|-id=619 bgcolor=#E9E9E9
| 502619 ||  || — || August 18, 2009 || Kitt Peak || Spacewatch ||  || align=right | 1.0 km || 
|-id=620 bgcolor=#fefefe
| 502620 ||  || — || November 16, 2006 || Catalina || CSS ||  || align=right data-sort-value="0.65" | 650 m || 
|-id=621 bgcolor=#E9E9E9
| 502621 ||  || — || March 2, 2006 || Mount Lemmon || Mount Lemmon Survey ||  || align=right | 2.5 km || 
|-id=622 bgcolor=#d6d6d6
| 502622 ||  || — || January 8, 1999 || Kitt Peak || Spacewatch ||  || align=right | 2.0 km || 
|-id=623 bgcolor=#fefefe
| 502623 ||  || — || September 18, 2006 || Kitt Peak || Spacewatch ||  || align=right data-sort-value="0.62" | 620 m || 
|-id=624 bgcolor=#E9E9E9
| 502624 ||  || — || February 6, 2006 || Kitt Peak || Spacewatch ||  || align=right | 2.4 km || 
|-id=625 bgcolor=#d6d6d6
| 502625 ||  || — || June 11, 2010 || WISE || WISE || ARM || align=right | 2.0 km || 
|-id=626 bgcolor=#d6d6d6
| 502626 ||  || — || March 15, 2010 || Mount Lemmon || Mount Lemmon Survey || EMA || align=right | 3.4 km || 
|-id=627 bgcolor=#E9E9E9
| 502627 ||  || — || March 10, 2007 || Mount Lemmon || Mount Lemmon Survey ||  || align=right data-sort-value="0.87" | 870 m || 
|-id=628 bgcolor=#d6d6d6
| 502628 ||  || — || October 1, 2008 || Kitt Peak || Spacewatch || KOR || align=right | 2.0 km || 
|-id=629 bgcolor=#E9E9E9
| 502629 ||  || — || March 30, 2011 || Mount Lemmon || Mount Lemmon Survey ||  || align=right | 1.8 km || 
|-id=630 bgcolor=#E9E9E9
| 502630 ||  || — || January 23, 2006 || Kitt Peak || Spacewatch ||  || align=right | 1.4 km || 
|-id=631 bgcolor=#d6d6d6
| 502631 ||  || — || February 14, 2010 || Mount Lemmon || Mount Lemmon Survey ||  || align=right | 2.6 km || 
|-id=632 bgcolor=#E9E9E9
| 502632 ||  || — || May 9, 2007 || Mount Lemmon || Mount Lemmon Survey ||  || align=right | 1.3 km || 
|-id=633 bgcolor=#E9E9E9
| 502633 ||  || — || January 30, 2011 || Haleakala || Pan-STARRS ||  || align=right data-sort-value="0.91" | 910 m || 
|-id=634 bgcolor=#E9E9E9
| 502634 ||  || — || January 26, 2011 || Mount Lemmon || Mount Lemmon Survey ||  || align=right data-sort-value="0.89" | 890 m || 
|-id=635 bgcolor=#E9E9E9
| 502635 ||  || — || January 6, 2006 || Catalina || CSS ||  || align=right | 1.5 km || 
|-id=636 bgcolor=#E9E9E9
| 502636 ||  || — || April 16, 2010 || WISE || WISE || WAT || align=right | 3.3 km || 
|-id=637 bgcolor=#E9E9E9
| 502637 ||  || — || September 22, 2008 || Mount Lemmon || Mount Lemmon Survey ||  || align=right | 2.9 km || 
|-id=638 bgcolor=#fefefe
| 502638 ||  || — || April 13, 2004 || Kitt Peak || Spacewatch ||  || align=right data-sort-value="0.90" | 900 m || 
|-id=639 bgcolor=#E9E9E9
| 502639 ||  || — || January 14, 2015 || Haleakala || Pan-STARRS ||  || align=right | 2.4 km || 
|-id=640 bgcolor=#d6d6d6
| 502640 ||  || — || February 29, 2004 || Kitt Peak || Spacewatch || TIR || align=right | 3.5 km || 
|-id=641 bgcolor=#E9E9E9
| 502641 ||  || — || March 31, 2011 || Haleakala || Pan-STARRS ||  || align=right | 1.3 km || 
|-id=642 bgcolor=#E9E9E9
| 502642 ||  || — || September 16, 2004 || Kitt Peak || Spacewatch || HNS || align=right | 1.9 km || 
|-id=643 bgcolor=#d6d6d6
| 502643 ||  || — || January 22, 2004 || Socorro || LINEAR ||  || align=right | 3.5 km || 
|-id=644 bgcolor=#fefefe
| 502644 ||  || — || December 25, 2006 || Kitt Peak || Spacewatch ||  || align=right data-sort-value="0.99" | 990 m || 
|-id=645 bgcolor=#d6d6d6
| 502645 ||  || — || June 24, 2010 || WISE || WISE ||  || align=right | 2.7 km || 
|-id=646 bgcolor=#E9E9E9
| 502646 ||  || — || September 7, 2008 || Mount Lemmon || Mount Lemmon Survey ||  || align=right | 2.4 km || 
|-id=647 bgcolor=#E9E9E9
| 502647 ||  || — || September 4, 2008 || Kitt Peak || Spacewatch || GEF || align=right | 2.6 km || 
|-id=648 bgcolor=#fefefe
| 502648 ||  || — || January 16, 2008 || Kitt Peak || Spacewatch ||  || align=right data-sort-value="0.76" | 760 m || 
|-id=649 bgcolor=#d6d6d6
| 502649 ||  || — || June 3, 2010 || WISE || WISE ||  || align=right | 3.2 km || 
|-id=650 bgcolor=#d6d6d6
| 502650 ||  || — || January 1, 2009 || Kitt Peak || Spacewatch ||  || align=right | 2.3 km || 
|-id=651 bgcolor=#E9E9E9
| 502651 ||  || — || September 7, 2008 || Catalina || CSS ||  || align=right | 2.0 km || 
|-id=652 bgcolor=#d6d6d6
| 502652 ||  || — || March 14, 2010 || Kitt Peak || Spacewatch ||  || align=right | 2.8 km || 
|-id=653 bgcolor=#E9E9E9
| 502653 ||  || — || August 24, 2008 || Kitt Peak || Spacewatch ||  || align=right | 2.7 km || 
|-id=654 bgcolor=#d6d6d6
| 502654 ||  || — || December 19, 2003 || Kitt Peak || Spacewatch || EOS || align=right | 3.3 km || 
|-id=655 bgcolor=#E9E9E9
| 502655 ||  || — || January 8, 2010 || Mount Lemmon || Mount Lemmon Survey ||  || align=right | 2.4 km || 
|-id=656 bgcolor=#d6d6d6
| 502656 ||  || — || February 12, 2004 || Kitt Peak || Spacewatch ||  || align=right | 2.8 km || 
|-id=657 bgcolor=#E9E9E9
| 502657 ||  || — || December 20, 2009 || Mount Lemmon || Mount Lemmon Survey || NEM || align=right | 1.8 km || 
|-id=658 bgcolor=#E9E9E9
| 502658 ||  || — || February 24, 2006 || Kitt Peak || Spacewatch ||  || align=right | 2.1 km || 
|-id=659 bgcolor=#E9E9E9
| 502659 ||  || — || July 30, 2008 || Kitt Peak || Spacewatch ||  || align=right | 2.2 km || 
|-id=660 bgcolor=#E9E9E9
| 502660 ||  || — || October 23, 2004 || Kitt Peak || Spacewatch ||  || align=right | 2.0 km || 
|-id=661 bgcolor=#d6d6d6
| 502661 ||  || — || February 19, 2010 || Kitt Peak || Spacewatch ||  || align=right | 3.4 km || 
|-id=662 bgcolor=#E9E9E9
| 502662 ||  || — || December 10, 2005 || Kitt Peak || Spacewatch ||  || align=right | 2.4 km || 
|-id=663 bgcolor=#d6d6d6
| 502663 ||  || — || January 1, 2009 || Mount Lemmon || Mount Lemmon Survey ||  || align=right | 2.5 km || 
|-id=664 bgcolor=#d6d6d6
| 502664 ||  || — || February 23, 2004 || Socorro || LINEAR ||  || align=right | 2.8 km || 
|-id=665 bgcolor=#E9E9E9
| 502665 ||  || — || September 24, 2008 || Kitt Peak || Spacewatch ||  || align=right | 2.1 km || 
|-id=666 bgcolor=#E9E9E9
| 502666 ||  || — || August 14, 2012 || Haleakala || Pan-STARRS ||  || align=right | 2.5 km || 
|-id=667 bgcolor=#d6d6d6
| 502667 ||  || — || October 5, 2012 || Haleakala || Pan-STARRS ||  || align=right | 3.0 km || 
|-id=668 bgcolor=#d6d6d6
| 502668 ||  || — || November 3, 2008 || Catalina || CSS ||  || align=right | 2.5 km || 
|-id=669 bgcolor=#fefefe
| 502669 ||  || — || November 17, 2006 || Mount Lemmon || Mount Lemmon Survey || NYS || align=right data-sort-value="0.80" | 800 m || 
|-id=670 bgcolor=#E9E9E9
| 502670 ||  || — || October 6, 2008 || Mount Lemmon || Mount Lemmon Survey ||  || align=right | 2.4 km || 
|-id=671 bgcolor=#E9E9E9
| 502671 ||  || — || September 7, 2000 || Kitt Peak || Spacewatch ||  || align=right | 1.4 km || 
|-id=672 bgcolor=#E9E9E9
| 502672 ||  || — || October 1, 2003 || Kitt Peak || Spacewatch ||  || align=right | 2.6 km || 
|-id=673 bgcolor=#d6d6d6
| 502673 ||  || — || February 15, 2010 || Kitt Peak || Spacewatch ||  || align=right | 2.4 km || 
|-id=674 bgcolor=#d6d6d6
| 502674 ||  || — || January 31, 2009 || Mount Lemmon || Mount Lemmon Survey || ALA || align=right | 2.7 km || 
|-id=675 bgcolor=#d6d6d6
| 502675 ||  || — || September 14, 2007 || Mount Lemmon || Mount Lemmon Survey ||  || align=right | 2.7 km || 
|-id=676 bgcolor=#d6d6d6
| 502676 ||  || — || September 17, 2006 || Catalina || CSS || EOS || align=right | 2.9 km || 
|-id=677 bgcolor=#d6d6d6
| 502677 ||  || — || January 23, 2015 || Haleakala || Pan-STARRS ||  || align=right | 2.5 km || 
|-id=678 bgcolor=#d6d6d6
| 502678 ||  || — || September 11, 2007 || Mount Lemmon || Mount Lemmon Survey ||  || align=right | 2.6 km || 
|-id=679 bgcolor=#d6d6d6
| 502679 ||  || — || January 29, 2009 || Mount Lemmon || Mount Lemmon Survey ||  || align=right | 2.6 km || 
|-id=680 bgcolor=#E9E9E9
| 502680 ||  || — || November 19, 2009 || Catalina || CSS || KON || align=right | 2.5 km || 
|-id=681 bgcolor=#d6d6d6
| 502681 ||  || — || September 10, 2007 || Kitt Peak || Spacewatch ||  || align=right | 2.5 km || 
|-id=682 bgcolor=#E9E9E9
| 502682 ||  || — || September 21, 2003 || Kitt Peak || Spacewatch ||  || align=right | 2.8 km || 
|-id=683 bgcolor=#d6d6d6
| 502683 ||  || — || March 1, 1998 || Kitt Peak || Spacewatch || THM || align=right | 2.7 km || 
|-id=684 bgcolor=#d6d6d6
| 502684 ||  || — || February 24, 1995 || Kitt Peak || Spacewatch ||  || align=right | 2.3 km || 
|-id=685 bgcolor=#E9E9E9
| 502685 ||  || — || December 10, 2009 || Mount Lemmon || Mount Lemmon Survey ||  || align=right | 2.8 km || 
|-id=686 bgcolor=#d6d6d6
| 502686 ||  || — || November 25, 2013 || XuYi || PMO NEO ||  || align=right | 2.6 km || 
|-id=687 bgcolor=#fefefe
| 502687 ||  || — || May 5, 2008 || Siding Spring || SSS ||  || align=right | 1.6 km || 
|-id=688 bgcolor=#E9E9E9
| 502688 ||  || — || September 18, 2003 || Kitt Peak || Spacewatch ||  || align=right | 3.3 km || 
|-id=689 bgcolor=#E9E9E9
| 502689 ||  || — || November 25, 2005 || Mount Lemmon || Mount Lemmon Survey ||  || align=right | 3.6 km || 
|-id=690 bgcolor=#E9E9E9
| 502690 ||  || — || February 7, 2006 || Catalina || CSS ||  || align=right | 1.7 km || 
|-id=691 bgcolor=#fefefe
| 502691 ||  || — || November 18, 2006 || Mount Lemmon || Mount Lemmon Survey ||  || align=right data-sort-value="0.81" | 810 m || 
|-id=692 bgcolor=#E9E9E9
| 502692 ||  || — || October 1, 2013 || Kitt Peak || Spacewatch || HOF || align=right | 1.8 km || 
|-id=693 bgcolor=#E9E9E9
| 502693 ||  || — || December 4, 2005 || Kitt Peak || Spacewatch ||  || align=right | 1.4 km || 
|-id=694 bgcolor=#E9E9E9
| 502694 ||  || — || October 5, 1996 || Kitt Peak || Spacewatch ||  || align=right | 1.3 km || 
|-id=695 bgcolor=#E9E9E9
| 502695 ||  || — || January 23, 2006 || Kitt Peak || Spacewatch ||  || align=right | 2.3 km || 
|-id=696 bgcolor=#E9E9E9
| 502696 ||  || — || October 4, 2013 || Mount Lemmon || Mount Lemmon Survey ||  || align=right | 1.7 km || 
|-id=697 bgcolor=#E9E9E9
| 502697 ||  || — || February 1, 2006 || Mount Lemmon || Mount Lemmon Survey ||  || align=right | 2.2 km || 
|-id=698 bgcolor=#fefefe
| 502698 ||  || — || January 24, 2007 || Kitt Peak || Spacewatch ||  || align=right data-sort-value="0.83" | 830 m || 
|-id=699 bgcolor=#E9E9E9
| 502699 ||  || — || April 27, 2011 || Kitt Peak || Spacewatch || WIT || align=right | 1.5 km || 
|-id=700 bgcolor=#fefefe
| 502700 ||  || — || March 7, 2008 || Catalina || CSS ||  || align=right data-sort-value="0.75" | 750 m || 
|}

502701–502800 

|-bgcolor=#E9E9E9
| 502701 ||  || — || November 11, 2004 || Kitt Peak || Spacewatch || AGN || align=right | 2.0 km || 
|-id=702 bgcolor=#d6d6d6
| 502702 ||  || — || May 13, 2005 || Kitt Peak || Spacewatch ||  || align=right | 2.3 km || 
|-id=703 bgcolor=#d6d6d6
| 502703 ||  || — || October 6, 2007 || Kitt Peak || Spacewatch ||  || align=right | 3.1 km || 
|-id=704 bgcolor=#E9E9E9
| 502704 ||  || — || January 23, 2006 || Kitt Peak || Spacewatch ||  || align=right | 1.4 km || 
|-id=705 bgcolor=#d6d6d6
| 502705 ||  || — || December 30, 2008 || Mount Lemmon || Mount Lemmon Survey || EOS || align=right | 3.4 km || 
|-id=706 bgcolor=#E9E9E9
| 502706 ||  || — || October 2, 2008 || Mount Lemmon || Mount Lemmon Survey ||  || align=right | 2.0 km || 
|-id=707 bgcolor=#d6d6d6
| 502707 ||  || — || December 2, 2008 || Kitt Peak || Spacewatch ||  || align=right | 2.2 km || 
|-id=708 bgcolor=#fefefe
| 502708 ||  || — || January 17, 2007 || Kitt Peak || Spacewatch ||  || align=right data-sort-value="0.79" | 790 m || 
|-id=709 bgcolor=#d6d6d6
| 502709 ||  || — || February 10, 2010 || WISE || WISE || LIX || align=right | 4.0 km || 
|-id=710 bgcolor=#E9E9E9
| 502710 ||  || — || November 22, 2009 || Kitt Peak || Spacewatch ||  || align=right | 3.1 km || 
|-id=711 bgcolor=#E9E9E9
| 502711 ||  || — || January 29, 1998 || Kitt Peak || Spacewatch ||  || align=right | 1.0 km || 
|-id=712 bgcolor=#E9E9E9
| 502712 ||  || — || February 27, 2006 || Kitt Peak || Spacewatch || HOF || align=right | 2.0 km || 
|-id=713 bgcolor=#E9E9E9
| 502713 ||  || — || August 4, 2008 || Siding Spring || SSS ||  || align=right | 2.5 km || 
|-id=714 bgcolor=#fefefe
| 502714 ||  || — || December 21, 2006 || Kitt Peak || Spacewatch ||  || align=right data-sort-value="0.73" | 730 m || 
|-id=715 bgcolor=#E9E9E9
| 502715 ||  || — || March 30, 2011 || Mount Lemmon || Mount Lemmon Survey ||  || align=right | 1.1 km || 
|-id=716 bgcolor=#E9E9E9
| 502716 ||  || — || September 23, 2008 || Mount Lemmon || Mount Lemmon Survey || HOF || align=right | 2.0 km || 
|-id=717 bgcolor=#E9E9E9
| 502717 ||  || — || November 10, 2009 || Kitt Peak || Spacewatch ||  || align=right | 1.3 km || 
|-id=718 bgcolor=#d6d6d6
| 502718 ||  || — || October 3, 2013 || Mount Lemmon || Mount Lemmon Survey ||  || align=right | 2.5 km || 
|-id=719 bgcolor=#d6d6d6
| 502719 ||  || — || January 2, 2009 || Mount Lemmon || Mount Lemmon Survey ||  || align=right | 2.3 km || 
|-id=720 bgcolor=#E9E9E9
| 502720 ||  || — || April 23, 2007 || Kitt Peak || Spacewatch ||  || align=right | 1.7 km || 
|-id=721 bgcolor=#E9E9E9
| 502721 ||  || — || February 9, 2002 || Kitt Peak || Spacewatch ||  || align=right | 1.5 km || 
|-id=722 bgcolor=#E9E9E9
| 502722 ||  || — || April 6, 2011 || Mount Lemmon || Mount Lemmon Survey ||  || align=right | 2.0 km || 
|-id=723 bgcolor=#fefefe
| 502723 ||  || — || April 7, 2008 || Mount Lemmon || Mount Lemmon Survey ||  || align=right data-sort-value="0.84" | 840 m || 
|-id=724 bgcolor=#d6d6d6
| 502724 ||  || — || March 18, 2010 || Mount Lemmon || Mount Lemmon Survey ||  || align=right | 2.6 km || 
|-id=725 bgcolor=#fefefe
| 502725 ||  || — || September 9, 2013 || Haleakala || Pan-STARRS ||  || align=right data-sort-value="0.93" | 930 m || 
|-id=726 bgcolor=#E9E9E9
| 502726 ||  || — || May 3, 2011 || Mount Lemmon || Mount Lemmon Survey || AEO || align=right | 2.4 km || 
|-id=727 bgcolor=#E9E9E9
| 502727 ||  || — || November 17, 2009 || Mount Lemmon || Mount Lemmon Survey ||  || align=right data-sort-value="0.71" | 710 m || 
|-id=728 bgcolor=#E9E9E9
| 502728 ||  || — || February 17, 2001 || Socorro || LINEAR ||  || align=right | 2.4 km || 
|-id=729 bgcolor=#E9E9E9
| 502729 ||  || — || January 23, 2006 || Kitt Peak || Spacewatch ||  || align=right | 1.5 km || 
|-id=730 bgcolor=#d6d6d6
| 502730 ||  || — || March 18, 2004 || Socorro || LINEAR || EOS || align=right | 3.0 km || 
|-id=731 bgcolor=#d6d6d6
| 502731 ||  || — || September 19, 2006 || Kitt Peak || Spacewatch || HYG || align=right | 3.1 km || 
|-id=732 bgcolor=#d6d6d6
| 502732 ||  || — || January 17, 2005 || Kitt Peak || Spacewatch ||  || align=right | 2.6 km || 
|-id=733 bgcolor=#d6d6d6
| 502733 ||  || — || March 1, 2009 || Mount Lemmon || Mount Lemmon Survey || 7:4 || align=right | 2.9 km || 
|-id=734 bgcolor=#d6d6d6
| 502734 ||  || — || September 12, 2007 || Mount Lemmon || Mount Lemmon Survey ||  || align=right | 2.4 km || 
|-id=735 bgcolor=#E9E9E9
| 502735 ||  || — || August 14, 2013 || Haleakala || Pan-STARRS ||  || align=right | 1.4 km || 
|-id=736 bgcolor=#d6d6d6
| 502736 ||  || — || February 16, 2010 || Kitt Peak || Spacewatch || EOS || align=right | 2.3 km || 
|-id=737 bgcolor=#d6d6d6
| 502737 ||  || — || November 8, 2007 || Kitt Peak || Spacewatch ||  || align=right | 2.6 km || 
|-id=738 bgcolor=#E9E9E9
| 502738 ||  || — || September 24, 2008 || Kitt Peak || Spacewatch ||  || align=right | 2.1 km || 
|-id=739 bgcolor=#d6d6d6
| 502739 ||  || — || November 29, 2013 || Haleakala || Pan-STARRS ||  || align=right | 2.5 km || 
|-id=740 bgcolor=#d6d6d6
| 502740 ||  || — || May 8, 2006 || Mount Lemmon || Mount Lemmon Survey ||  || align=right | 3.1 km || 
|-id=741 bgcolor=#E9E9E9
| 502741 ||  || — || November 19, 2009 || Mount Lemmon || Mount Lemmon Survey ||  || align=right | 1.9 km || 
|-id=742 bgcolor=#d6d6d6
| 502742 ||  || — || March 20, 2010 || Mount Lemmon || Mount Lemmon Survey ||  || align=right | 2.8 km || 
|-id=743 bgcolor=#E9E9E9
| 502743 ||  || — || October 22, 2008 || Mount Lemmon || Mount Lemmon Survey || HOF || align=right | 2.1 km || 
|-id=744 bgcolor=#E9E9E9
| 502744 ||  || — || October 29, 2008 || Mount Lemmon || Mount Lemmon Survey || HOF || align=right | 2.1 km || 
|-id=745 bgcolor=#d6d6d6
| 502745 ||  || — || December 31, 2008 || Kitt Peak || Spacewatch ||  || align=right | 2.3 km || 
|-id=746 bgcolor=#E9E9E9
| 502746 ||  || — || October 7, 2005 || Catalina || CSS ||  || align=right data-sort-value="0.88" | 880 m || 
|-id=747 bgcolor=#E9E9E9
| 502747 ||  || — || February 9, 2010 || Mount Lemmon || Mount Lemmon Survey ||  || align=right | 2.5 km || 
|-id=748 bgcolor=#E9E9E9
| 502748 ||  || — || December 25, 2013 || Mount Lemmon || Mount Lemmon Survey || WIT || align=right | 1.9 km || 
|-id=749 bgcolor=#d6d6d6
| 502749 ||  || — || December 2, 2008 || Kitt Peak || Spacewatch || HYG || align=right | 2.6 km || 
|-id=750 bgcolor=#E9E9E9
| 502750 ||  || — || March 27, 2011 || Mount Lemmon || Mount Lemmon Survey || WIT || align=right | 2.3 km || 
|-id=751 bgcolor=#d6d6d6
| 502751 ||  || — || July 1, 2010 || WISE || WISE ||  || align=right | 3.9 km || 
|-id=752 bgcolor=#E9E9E9
| 502752 ||  || — || April 9, 2002 || Kitt Peak || Spacewatch ||  || align=right | 3.1 km || 
|-id=753 bgcolor=#d6d6d6
| 502753 ||  || — || April 2, 2005 || Kitt Peak || Spacewatch || KOR || align=right | 3.1 km || 
|-id=754 bgcolor=#d6d6d6
| 502754 ||  || — || August 19, 2006 || Kitt Peak || Spacewatch ||  || align=right | 2.9 km || 
|-id=755 bgcolor=#d6d6d6
| 502755 ||  || — || January 16, 2004 || Kitt Peak || Spacewatch ||  || align=right | 2.3 km || 
|-id=756 bgcolor=#d6d6d6
| 502756 ||  || — || March 8, 2005 || Mount Lemmon || Mount Lemmon Survey || THM || align=right | 2.4 km || 
|-id=757 bgcolor=#E9E9E9
| 502757 ||  || — || March 4, 2006 || Kitt Peak || Spacewatch ||  || align=right | 1.8 km || 
|-id=758 bgcolor=#d6d6d6
| 502758 ||  || — || March 20, 2010 || Mount Lemmon || Mount Lemmon Survey || EOS || align=right | 2.3 km || 
|-id=759 bgcolor=#fefefe
| 502759 ||  || — || October 22, 2006 || Kitt Peak || Spacewatch || MAS || align=right data-sort-value="0.52" | 520 m || 
|-id=760 bgcolor=#E9E9E9
| 502760 ||  || — || November 26, 2009 || Kitt Peak || Spacewatch ||  || align=right | 1.2 km || 
|-id=761 bgcolor=#d6d6d6
| 502761 ||  || — || July 21, 2006 || Mount Lemmon || Mount Lemmon Survey ||  || align=right | 2.9 km || 
|-id=762 bgcolor=#E9E9E9
| 502762 ||  || — || November 25, 2005 || Kitt Peak || Spacewatch ||  || align=right data-sort-value="0.77" | 770 m || 
|-id=763 bgcolor=#fefefe
| 502763 ||  || — || January 14, 2011 || Kitt Peak || Spacewatch ||  || align=right data-sort-value="0.72" | 720 m || 
|-id=764 bgcolor=#E9E9E9
| 502764 ||  || — || January 6, 2010 || Mount Lemmon || Mount Lemmon Survey ||  || align=right | 1.8 km || 
|-id=765 bgcolor=#d6d6d6
| 502765 ||  || — || December 27, 2013 || Mount Lemmon || Mount Lemmon Survey ||  || align=right | 2.9 km || 
|-id=766 bgcolor=#E9E9E9
| 502766 ||  || — || April 22, 2002 || Kitt Peak || Spacewatch ||  || align=right | 1.9 km || 
|-id=767 bgcolor=#d6d6d6
| 502767 ||  || — || April 14, 2010 || Mount Lemmon || Mount Lemmon Survey ||  || align=right | 2.7 km || 
|-id=768 bgcolor=#d6d6d6
| 502768 ||  || — || December 31, 2008 || Kitt Peak || Spacewatch ||  || align=right | 2.7 km || 
|-id=769 bgcolor=#d6d6d6
| 502769 ||  || — || March 15, 2010 || Kitt Peak || Spacewatch || THB || align=right | 3.4 km || 
|-id=770 bgcolor=#E9E9E9
| 502770 ||  || — || December 18, 2000 || Kitt Peak || Spacewatch ||  || align=right | 1.7 km || 
|-id=771 bgcolor=#E9E9E9
| 502771 ||  || — || January 25, 2006 || Kitt Peak || Spacewatch ||  || align=right | 1.3 km || 
|-id=772 bgcolor=#d6d6d6
| 502772 ||  || — || March 21, 2010 || Kitt Peak || Spacewatch || THM || align=right | 2.5 km || 
|-id=773 bgcolor=#E9E9E9
| 502773 ||  || — || February 5, 2010 || WISE || WISE ||  || align=right | 2.5 km || 
|-id=774 bgcolor=#E9E9E9
| 502774 ||  || — || September 22, 2008 || Kitt Peak || Spacewatch ||  || align=right | 2.0 km || 
|-id=775 bgcolor=#E9E9E9
| 502775 ||  || — || October 9, 2013 || Mount Lemmon || Mount Lemmon Survey ||  || align=right | 1.7 km || 
|-id=776 bgcolor=#E9E9E9
| 502776 ||  || — || February 8, 1999 || Kitt Peak || Spacewatch ||  || align=right data-sort-value="0.65" | 650 m || 
|-id=777 bgcolor=#E9E9E9
| 502777 ||  || — || September 29, 2005 || Mount Lemmon || Mount Lemmon Survey ||  || align=right data-sort-value="0.84" | 840 m || 
|-id=778 bgcolor=#d6d6d6
| 502778 ||  || — || March 15, 2010 || Mount Lemmon || Mount Lemmon Survey ||  || align=right | 2.8 km || 
|-id=779 bgcolor=#d6d6d6
| 502779 ||  || — || September 11, 2007 || Mount Lemmon || Mount Lemmon Survey ||  || align=right | 2.7 km || 
|-id=780 bgcolor=#E9E9E9
| 502780 ||  || — || February 27, 2006 || Kitt Peak || Spacewatch || AGN || align=right | 1.8 km || 
|-id=781 bgcolor=#d6d6d6
| 502781 ||  || — || December 21, 2008 || Kitt Peak || Spacewatch ||  || align=right | 2.6 km || 
|-id=782 bgcolor=#d6d6d6
| 502782 ||  || — || February 18, 2010 || Kitt Peak || Spacewatch || KOR || align=right | 2.5 km || 
|-id=783 bgcolor=#E9E9E9
| 502783 ||  || — || October 6, 2008 || Mount Lemmon || Mount Lemmon Survey || AGN || align=right | 2.2 km || 
|-id=784 bgcolor=#E9E9E9
| 502784 ||  || — || January 21, 2006 || Kitt Peak || Spacewatch ||  || align=right | 2.5 km || 
|-id=785 bgcolor=#E9E9E9
| 502785 ||  || — || September 23, 2008 || Mount Lemmon || Mount Lemmon Survey || WIT || align=right | 2.8 km || 
|-id=786 bgcolor=#E9E9E9
| 502786 ||  || — || March 26, 2003 || Kitt Peak || Spacewatch || MAR || align=right | 1.2 km || 
|-id=787 bgcolor=#E9E9E9
| 502787 ||  || — || September 2, 2008 || Kitt Peak || Spacewatch ||  || align=right | 1.8 km || 
|-id=788 bgcolor=#d6d6d6
| 502788 ||  || — || August 19, 2006 || Kitt Peak || Spacewatch || EOS || align=right | 3.0 km || 
|-id=789 bgcolor=#d6d6d6
| 502789 ||  || — || December 21, 2008 || Mount Lemmon || Mount Lemmon Survey ||  || align=right | 2.1 km || 
|-id=790 bgcolor=#E9E9E9
| 502790 ||  || — || March 23, 2006 || Kitt Peak || Spacewatch ||  || align=right | 2.7 km || 
|-id=791 bgcolor=#E9E9E9
| 502791 ||  || — || November 9, 2009 || Mount Lemmon || Mount Lemmon Survey ||  || align=right | 1.9 km || 
|-id=792 bgcolor=#d6d6d6
| 502792 ||  || — || April 7, 2005 || Siding Spring || SSS ||  || align=right | 3.3 km || 
|-id=793 bgcolor=#d6d6d6
| 502793 ||  || — || June 17, 2010 || WISE || WISE ||  || align=right | 2.5 km || 
|-id=794 bgcolor=#E9E9E9
| 502794 ||  || — || November 25, 2005 || Kitt Peak || Spacewatch ||  || align=right | 1.5 km || 
|-id=795 bgcolor=#E9E9E9
| 502795 ||  || — || September 25, 2013 || Mount Lemmon || Mount Lemmon Survey ||  || align=right data-sort-value="0.70" | 700 m || 
|-id=796 bgcolor=#E9E9E9
| 502796 ||  || — || February 26, 2007 || Mount Lemmon || Mount Lemmon Survey ||  || align=right | 1.9 km || 
|-id=797 bgcolor=#E9E9E9
| 502797 ||  || — || September 25, 2009 || Kitt Peak || Spacewatch || (5) || align=right data-sort-value="0.85" | 850 m || 
|-id=798 bgcolor=#E9E9E9
| 502798 ||  || — || December 19, 2001 || Kitt Peak || Spacewatch ||  || align=right | 1.7 km || 
|-id=799 bgcolor=#E9E9E9
| 502799 ||  || — || March 21, 2002 || Kitt Peak || Spacewatch ||  || align=right | 2.5 km || 
|-id=800 bgcolor=#E9E9E9
| 502800 ||  || — || February 6, 2002 || Socorro || LINEAR || MAR || align=right | 2.1 km || 
|}

502801–502900 

|-bgcolor=#E9E9E9
| 502801 ||  || — || March 31, 2011 || Haleakala || Pan-STARRS ||  || align=right | 1.9 km || 
|-id=802 bgcolor=#E9E9E9
| 502802 ||  || — || October 25, 2013 || Mount Lemmon || Mount Lemmon Survey ||  || align=right | 2.2 km || 
|-id=803 bgcolor=#d6d6d6
| 502803 ||  || — || April 12, 2010 || Mount Lemmon || Mount Lemmon Survey ||  || align=right | 3.1 km || 
|-id=804 bgcolor=#d6d6d6
| 502804 ||  || — || November 28, 2013 || Mount Lemmon || Mount Lemmon Survey ||  || align=right | 2.5 km || 
|-id=805 bgcolor=#E9E9E9
| 502805 ||  || — || September 3, 2013 || Haleakala || Pan-STARRS || HNS || align=right data-sort-value="0.75" | 750 m || 
|-id=806 bgcolor=#E9E9E9
| 502806 ||  || — || May 11, 2007 || Mount Lemmon || Mount Lemmon Survey ||  || align=right | 1.5 km || 
|-id=807 bgcolor=#E9E9E9
| 502807 ||  || — || April 5, 2011 || Kitt Peak || Spacewatch ||  || align=right | 1.9 km || 
|-id=808 bgcolor=#d6d6d6
| 502808 ||  || — || February 17, 2010 || Catalina || CSS || EOS || align=right | 2.9 km || 
|-id=809 bgcolor=#E9E9E9
| 502809 ||  || — || April 25, 2007 || Mount Lemmon || Mount Lemmon Survey ||  || align=right | 1.7 km || 
|-id=810 bgcolor=#d6d6d6
| 502810 ||  || — || April 2, 2011 || Mount Lemmon || Mount Lemmon Survey || BRA || align=right | 1.6 km || 
|-id=811 bgcolor=#E9E9E9
| 502811 ||  || — || November 4, 2004 || Kitt Peak || Spacewatch ||  || align=right | 2.2 km || 
|-id=812 bgcolor=#E9E9E9
| 502812 ||  || — || January 8, 2010 || Mount Lemmon || Mount Lemmon Survey ||  || align=right | 2.6 km || 
|-id=813 bgcolor=#E9E9E9
| 502813 ||  || — || November 2, 2013 || Mount Lemmon || Mount Lemmon Survey || WIT || align=right | 1.4 km || 
|-id=814 bgcolor=#d6d6d6
| 502814 ||  || — || December 31, 2008 || Mount Lemmon || Mount Lemmon Survey || EOS || align=right | 1.7 km || 
|-id=815 bgcolor=#d6d6d6
| 502815 ||  || — || February 8, 2010 || WISE || WISE ||  || align=right | 3.5 km || 
|-id=816 bgcolor=#E9E9E9
| 502816 ||  || — || September 30, 2005 || Mount Lemmon || Mount Lemmon Survey ||  || align=right data-sort-value="0.94" | 940 m || 
|-id=817 bgcolor=#E9E9E9
| 502817 ||  || — || December 5, 2005 || Kitt Peak || Spacewatch ||  || align=right | 1.2 km || 
|-id=818 bgcolor=#d6d6d6
| 502818 ||  || — || February 13, 2010 || WISE || WISE || URS || align=right | 3.0 km || 
|-id=819 bgcolor=#E9E9E9
| 502819 ||  || — || February 5, 2011 || Mount Lemmon || Mount Lemmon Survey ||  || align=right data-sort-value="0.87" | 870 m || 
|-id=820 bgcolor=#E9E9E9
| 502820 ||  || — || February 16, 2010 || Mount Lemmon || Mount Lemmon Survey ||  || align=right | 2.6 km || 
|-id=821 bgcolor=#E9E9E9
| 502821 ||  || — || September 14, 2004 || Anderson Mesa || LONEOS ||  || align=right | 2.3 km || 
|-id=822 bgcolor=#E9E9E9
| 502822 ||  || — || December 12, 2004 || Kitt Peak || Spacewatch ||  || align=right | 2.7 km || 
|-id=823 bgcolor=#E9E9E9
| 502823 ||  || — || January 26, 2006 || Mount Lemmon || Mount Lemmon Survey ||  || align=right | 1.9 km || 
|-id=824 bgcolor=#fefefe
| 502824 ||  || — || September 2, 2010 || Mount Lemmon || Mount Lemmon Survey ||  || align=right data-sort-value="0.60" | 600 m || 
|-id=825 bgcolor=#E9E9E9
| 502825 ||  || — || December 11, 2001 || Socorro || LINEAR || EUN || align=right | 1.2 km || 
|-id=826 bgcolor=#E9E9E9
| 502826 ||  || — || February 21, 2007 || Catalina || CSS ||  || align=right | 1.1 km || 
|-id=827 bgcolor=#d6d6d6
| 502827 ||  || — || March 17, 2005 || Mount Lemmon || Mount Lemmon Survey || HYG || align=right | 2.8 km || 
|-id=828 bgcolor=#fefefe
| 502828 ||  || — || April 15, 2008 || Mount Lemmon || Mount Lemmon Survey ||  || align=right data-sort-value="0.74" | 740 m || 
|-id=829 bgcolor=#E9E9E9
| 502829 ||  || — || March 9, 2011 || Mount Lemmon || Mount Lemmon Survey ||  || align=right | 2.6 km || 
|-id=830 bgcolor=#E9E9E9
| 502830 ||  || — || December 5, 2005 || Kitt Peak || Spacewatch ||  || align=right | 1.5 km || 
|-id=831 bgcolor=#d6d6d6
| 502831 ||  || — || June 24, 2010 || WISE || WISE || LIX || align=right | 3.1 km || 
|-id=832 bgcolor=#E9E9E9
| 502832 ||  || — || September 16, 2004 || Socorro || LINEAR ||  || align=right | 2.6 km || 
|-id=833 bgcolor=#d6d6d6
| 502833 ||  || — || May 13, 2010 || Mount Lemmon || Mount Lemmon Survey ||  || align=right | 2.7 km || 
|-id=834 bgcolor=#E9E9E9
| 502834 ||  || — || September 20, 2008 || Kitt Peak || Spacewatch || PAD || align=right | 3.8 km || 
|-id=835 bgcolor=#E9E9E9
| 502835 ||  || — || October 24, 2008 || Mount Lemmon || Mount Lemmon Survey ||  || align=right | 1.9 km || 
|-id=836 bgcolor=#E9E9E9
| 502836 ||  || — || December 10, 2004 || Kitt Peak || Spacewatch || AGN || align=right | 2.1 km || 
|-id=837 bgcolor=#E9E9E9
| 502837 ||  || — || October 29, 2008 || Mount Lemmon || Mount Lemmon Survey || HOF || align=right | 2.5 km || 
|-id=838 bgcolor=#E9E9E9
| 502838 ||  || — || January 7, 2010 || Kitt Peak || Spacewatch ||  || align=right | 2.4 km || 
|-id=839 bgcolor=#d6d6d6
| 502839 ||  || — || June 3, 2011 || Mount Lemmon || Mount Lemmon Survey ||  || align=right | 3.2 km || 
|-id=840 bgcolor=#E9E9E9
| 502840 ||  || — || November 27, 2009 || Mount Lemmon || Mount Lemmon Survey ||  || align=right | 2.0 km || 
|-id=841 bgcolor=#E9E9E9
| 502841 ||  || — || February 13, 2010 || Mount Lemmon || Mount Lemmon Survey ||  || align=right | 2.4 km || 
|-id=842 bgcolor=#d6d6d6
| 502842 ||  || — || November 7, 2007 || Catalina || CSS || EOS || align=right | 1.9 km || 
|-id=843 bgcolor=#d6d6d6
| 502843 ||  || — || February 18, 2015 || Haleakala || Pan-STARRS || EOS || align=right | 2.0 km || 
|-id=844 bgcolor=#E9E9E9
| 502844 ||  || — || February 1, 2006 || Kitt Peak || Spacewatch ||  || align=right | 1.3 km || 
|-id=845 bgcolor=#E9E9E9
| 502845 ||  || — || October 6, 2008 || Mount Lemmon || Mount Lemmon Survey ||  || align=right | 2.0 km || 
|-id=846 bgcolor=#d6d6d6
| 502846 ||  || — || September 26, 2006 || Kitt Peak || Spacewatch ||  || align=right | 3.3 km || 
|-id=847 bgcolor=#E9E9E9
| 502847 ||  || — || November 20, 2009 || Kitt Peak || Spacewatch ||  || align=right | 2.8 km || 
|-id=848 bgcolor=#E9E9E9
| 502848 ||  || — || December 30, 2014 || Haleakala || Pan-STARRS || HNS || align=right | 1.6 km || 
|-id=849 bgcolor=#E9E9E9
| 502849 ||  || — || March 14, 2007 || Mount Lemmon || Mount Lemmon Survey ||  || align=right | 2.0 km || 
|-id=850 bgcolor=#d6d6d6
| 502850 ||  || — || December 30, 2008 || Kitt Peak || Spacewatch || EOS || align=right | 2.0 km || 
|-id=851 bgcolor=#E9E9E9
| 502851 ||  || — || November 17, 2009 || Mount Lemmon || Mount Lemmon Survey ||  || align=right | 1.8 km || 
|-id=852 bgcolor=#E9E9E9
| 502852 ||  || — || June 10, 2012 || Haleakala || Pan-STARRS ||  || align=right | 1.5 km || 
|-id=853 bgcolor=#d6d6d6
| 502853 ||  || — || November 8, 2013 || Catalina || CSS ||  || align=right | 3.5 km || 
|-id=854 bgcolor=#E9E9E9
| 502854 ||  || — || March 11, 2011 || Mount Lemmon || Mount Lemmon Survey ||  || align=right | 1.5 km || 
|-id=855 bgcolor=#E9E9E9
| 502855 ||  || — || January 30, 2006 || Catalina || CSS ||  || align=right | 2.2 km || 
|-id=856 bgcolor=#d6d6d6
| 502856 ||  || — || October 20, 2006 || Kitt Peak || Spacewatch ||  || align=right | 3.9 km || 
|-id=857 bgcolor=#d6d6d6
| 502857 ||  || — || September 14, 2007 || Mount Lemmon || Mount Lemmon Survey ||  || align=right | 2.8 km || 
|-id=858 bgcolor=#d6d6d6
| 502858 ||  || — || April 10, 2010 || Mount Lemmon || Mount Lemmon Survey || VER  EOS || align=right | 2.5 km || 
|-id=859 bgcolor=#d6d6d6
| 502859 ||  || — || November 24, 2008 || Mount Lemmon || Mount Lemmon Survey || EOS || align=right | 1.7 km || 
|-id=860 bgcolor=#E9E9E9
| 502860 ||  || — || February 7, 2002 || Socorro || LINEAR ||  || align=right | 1.7 km || 
|-id=861 bgcolor=#E9E9E9
| 502861 ||  || — || February 15, 2010 || Catalina || CSS ||  || align=right | 3.2 km || 
|-id=862 bgcolor=#d6d6d6
| 502862 ||  || — || February 12, 2004 || Kitt Peak || Spacewatch || HYG || align=right | 2.4 km || 
|-id=863 bgcolor=#d6d6d6
| 502863 ||  || — || January 19, 2005 || Kitt Peak || Spacewatch ||  || align=right | 2.7 km || 
|-id=864 bgcolor=#E9E9E9
| 502864 ||  || — || January 16, 2010 || Kitt Peak || Spacewatch ||  || align=right | 1.5 km || 
|-id=865 bgcolor=#d6d6d6
| 502865 ||  || — || September 16, 2012 || Catalina || CSS ||  || align=right | 3.3 km || 
|-id=866 bgcolor=#d6d6d6
| 502866 ||  || — || October 8, 2012 || Mount Lemmon || Mount Lemmon Survey || EOS || align=right | 1.5 km || 
|-id=867 bgcolor=#E9E9E9
| 502867 ||  || — || January 15, 2010 || Mount Lemmon || Mount Lemmon Survey || WAT || align=right | 2.7 km || 
|-id=868 bgcolor=#d6d6d6
| 502868 ||  || — || September 29, 2003 || Kitt Peak || Spacewatch ||  || align=right | 2.2 km || 
|-id=869 bgcolor=#d6d6d6
| 502869 ||  || — || January 31, 2009 || Kitt Peak || Spacewatch ||  || align=right | 3.4 km || 
|-id=870 bgcolor=#d6d6d6
| 502870 ||  || — || October 8, 2012 || Haleakala || Pan-STARRS ||  || align=right | 2.4 km || 
|-id=871 bgcolor=#d6d6d6
| 502871 ||  || — || August 28, 2006 || Kitt Peak || Spacewatch ||  || align=right | 3.3 km || 
|-id=872 bgcolor=#E9E9E9
| 502872 ||  || — || February 17, 2010 || Kitt Peak || Spacewatch ||  || align=right | 2.0 km || 
|-id=873 bgcolor=#d6d6d6
| 502873 ||  || — || February 12, 2004 || Kitt Peak || Spacewatch || EOS || align=right | 1.8 km || 
|-id=874 bgcolor=#E9E9E9
| 502874 ||  || — || February 15, 2010 || Catalina || CSS ||  || align=right | 2.4 km || 
|-id=875 bgcolor=#d6d6d6
| 502875 ||  || — || December 31, 2013 || Kitt Peak || Spacewatch || EOS || align=right | 1.8 km || 
|-id=876 bgcolor=#d6d6d6
| 502876 ||  || — || January 31, 2009 || Mount Lemmon || Mount Lemmon Survey ||  || align=right | 2.0 km || 
|-id=877 bgcolor=#d6d6d6
| 502877 ||  || — || May 13, 2004 || Kitt Peak || Spacewatch || TIR || align=right | 2.6 km || 
|-id=878 bgcolor=#E9E9E9
| 502878 ||  || — || February 23, 2015 || Haleakala || Pan-STARRS ||  || align=right data-sort-value="0.85" | 850 m || 
|-id=879 bgcolor=#d6d6d6
| 502879 ||  || — || March 16, 2004 || Kitt Peak || Spacewatch ||  || align=right | 2.2 km || 
|-id=880 bgcolor=#E9E9E9
| 502880 ||  || — || October 6, 2008 || Mount Lemmon || Mount Lemmon Survey ||  || align=right | 2.1 km || 
|-id=881 bgcolor=#d6d6d6
| 502881 ||  || — || August 18, 2006 || Kitt Peak || Spacewatch ||  || align=right | 2.7 km || 
|-id=882 bgcolor=#d6d6d6
| 502882 ||  || — || November 20, 2007 || Mount Lemmon || Mount Lemmon Survey || VER || align=right | 2.7 km || 
|-id=883 bgcolor=#d6d6d6
| 502883 ||  || — || March 15, 2004 || Kitt Peak || Spacewatch ||  || align=right | 2.8 km || 
|-id=884 bgcolor=#d6d6d6
| 502884 ||  || — || March 13, 2010 || WISE || WISE || Tj (2.97) || align=right | 3.3 km || 
|-id=885 bgcolor=#d6d6d6
| 502885 ||  || — || November 14, 2007 || Kitt Peak || Spacewatch ||  || align=right | 2.8 km || 
|-id=886 bgcolor=#d6d6d6
| 502886 ||  || — || February 16, 2009 || La Sagra || OAM Obs. ||  || align=right | 5.3 km || 
|-id=887 bgcolor=#d6d6d6
| 502887 ||  || — || October 8, 2007 || Catalina || CSS || EOS || align=right | 2.2 km || 
|-id=888 bgcolor=#d6d6d6
| 502888 ||  || — || September 19, 2012 || Mount Lemmon || Mount Lemmon Survey ||  || align=right | 2.5 km || 
|-id=889 bgcolor=#E9E9E9
| 502889 ||  || — || March 12, 2011 || Siding Spring || SSS || EUN || align=right | 1.4 km || 
|-id=890 bgcolor=#d6d6d6
| 502890 ||  || — || October 9, 2012 || Haleakala || Pan-STARRS ||  || align=right | 3.3 km || 
|-id=891 bgcolor=#d6d6d6
| 502891 ||  || — || August 28, 2006 || Kitt Peak || Spacewatch ||  || align=right | 3.8 km || 
|-id=892 bgcolor=#d6d6d6
| 502892 ||  || — || March 13, 2010 || Kitt Peak || Spacewatch || EOS || align=right | 1.8 km || 
|-id=893 bgcolor=#C2FFFF
| 502893 ||  || — || October 31, 2010 || Kitt Peak || Spacewatch || L4 || align=right | 9.0 km || 
|-id=894 bgcolor=#E9E9E9
| 502894 ||  || — || January 20, 2015 || Haleakala || Pan-STARRS ||  || align=right | 1.4 km || 
|-id=895 bgcolor=#fefefe
| 502895 ||  || — || November 18, 2006 || Mount Lemmon || Mount Lemmon Survey ||  || align=right data-sort-value="0.83" | 830 m || 
|-id=896 bgcolor=#E9E9E9
| 502896 ||  || — || November 24, 2009 || Mount Lemmon || Mount Lemmon Survey ||  || align=right data-sort-value="0.86" | 860 m || 
|-id=897 bgcolor=#E9E9E9
| 502897 ||  || — || March 11, 2007 || Kitt Peak || Spacewatch ||  || align=right data-sort-value="0.94" | 940 m || 
|-id=898 bgcolor=#d6d6d6
| 502898 ||  || — || August 28, 2006 || Kitt Peak || Spacewatch ||  || align=right | 4.2 km || 
|-id=899 bgcolor=#d6d6d6
| 502899 ||  || — || September 13, 2007 || Mount Lemmon || Mount Lemmon Survey || EOS || align=right | 2.8 km || 
|-id=900 bgcolor=#E9E9E9
| 502900 ||  || — || April 3, 2011 || Haleakala || Pan-STARRS ||  || align=right | 1.8 km || 
|}

502901–503000 

|-bgcolor=#E9E9E9
| 502901 ||  || — || February 27, 2006 || Catalina || CSS ||  || align=right | 2.9 km || 
|-id=902 bgcolor=#d6d6d6
| 502902 ||  || — || October 15, 2007 || Mount Lemmon || Mount Lemmon Survey ||  || align=right | 3.0 km || 
|-id=903 bgcolor=#d6d6d6
| 502903 ||  || — || February 1, 2005 || Kitt Peak || Spacewatch || KAR || align=right | 2.8 km || 
|-id=904 bgcolor=#E9E9E9
| 502904 ||  || — || September 3, 2008 || Kitt Peak || Spacewatch ||  || align=right | 2.2 km || 
|-id=905 bgcolor=#E9E9E9
| 502905 ||  || — || March 20, 2007 || Kitt Peak || Spacewatch ||  || align=right | 1.4 km || 
|-id=906 bgcolor=#E9E9E9
| 502906 ||  || — || October 7, 2004 || Kitt Peak || Spacewatch ||  || align=right | 1.5 km || 
|-id=907 bgcolor=#d6d6d6
| 502907 ||  || — || September 18, 1995 || Kitt Peak || Spacewatch || TIR || align=right | 3.3 km || 
|-id=908 bgcolor=#E9E9E9
| 502908 ||  || — || October 3, 2013 || Haleakala || Pan-STARRS || WIT || align=right | 1.8 km || 
|-id=909 bgcolor=#fefefe
| 502909 ||  || — || November 14, 1998 || Kitt Peak || Spacewatch ||  || align=right data-sort-value="0.77" | 770 m || 
|-id=910 bgcolor=#d6d6d6
| 502910 ||  || — || November 29, 2013 || Haleakala || Pan-STARRS || EOS || align=right | 3.4 km || 
|-id=911 bgcolor=#E9E9E9
| 502911 ||  || — || February 24, 2006 || Kitt Peak || Spacewatch || GEF || align=right | 2.3 km || 
|-id=912 bgcolor=#E9E9E9
| 502912 ||  || — || November 24, 2009 || Kitt Peak || Spacewatch || WIT || align=right | 1.4 km || 
|-id=913 bgcolor=#d6d6d6
| 502913 ||  || — || January 14, 2010 || WISE || WISE ||  || align=right | 2.1 km || 
|-id=914 bgcolor=#E9E9E9
| 502914 ||  || — || March 4, 2006 || Kitt Peak || Spacewatch || GEF || align=right | 1.8 km || 
|-id=915 bgcolor=#E9E9E9
| 502915 ||  || — || September 10, 2004 || Kitt Peak || Spacewatch ||  || align=right | 1.7 km || 
|-id=916 bgcolor=#d6d6d6
| 502916 ||  || — || January 23, 2010 || WISE || WISE ||  || align=right | 2.7 km || 
|-id=917 bgcolor=#d6d6d6
| 502917 ||  || — || August 21, 2006 || Kitt Peak || Spacewatch ||  || align=right | 2.4 km || 
|-id=918 bgcolor=#E9E9E9
| 502918 ||  || — || January 31, 2006 || Mount Lemmon || Mount Lemmon Survey || WIT || align=right | 2.0 km || 
|-id=919 bgcolor=#E9E9E9
| 502919 ||  || — || September 27, 2013 || Haleakala || Pan-STARRS ||  || align=right | 1.6 km || 
|-id=920 bgcolor=#d6d6d6
| 502920 ||  || — || January 23, 2010 || WISE || WISE ||  || align=right | 2.3 km || 
|-id=921 bgcolor=#d6d6d6
| 502921 ||  || — || November 5, 2007 || Kitt Peak || Spacewatch ||  || align=right | 2.5 km || 
|-id=922 bgcolor=#E9E9E9
| 502922 ||  || — || February 2, 2006 || Mount Lemmon || Mount Lemmon Survey || WIT || align=right | 1.2 km || 
|-id=923 bgcolor=#d6d6d6
| 502923 ||  || — || August 26, 2012 || Haleakala || Pan-STARRS ||  || align=right | 3.1 km || 
|-id=924 bgcolor=#E9E9E9
| 502924 ||  || — || September 2, 2008 || Kitt Peak || Spacewatch || HOF || align=right | 2.1 km || 
|-id=925 bgcolor=#E9E9E9
| 502925 ||  || — || January 26, 2006 || Kitt Peak || Spacewatch ||  || align=right | 2.0 km || 
|-id=926 bgcolor=#E9E9E9
| 502926 ||  || — || November 16, 1995 || Kitt Peak || Spacewatch ||  || align=right | 2.1 km || 
|-id=927 bgcolor=#d6d6d6
| 502927 ||  || — || September 24, 2012 || Mount Lemmon || Mount Lemmon Survey || URS || align=right | 3.2 km || 
|-id=928 bgcolor=#d6d6d6
| 502928 ||  || — || December 31, 2008 || Kitt Peak || Spacewatch ||  || align=right | 2.5 km || 
|-id=929 bgcolor=#E9E9E9
| 502929 ||  || — || February 24, 2006 || Mount Lemmon || Mount Lemmon Survey ||  || align=right | 2.0 km || 
|-id=930 bgcolor=#E9E9E9
| 502930 ||  || — || January 7, 2010 || Kitt Peak || Spacewatch || AGN || align=right | 1.9 km || 
|-id=931 bgcolor=#E9E9E9
| 502931 ||  || — || January 11, 2010 || Mount Lemmon || Mount Lemmon Survey || WIT || align=right | 2.0 km || 
|-id=932 bgcolor=#E9E9E9
| 502932 ||  || — || November 9, 2008 || Kitt Peak || Spacewatch ||  || align=right | 2.3 km || 
|-id=933 bgcolor=#E9E9E9
| 502933 ||  || — || November 11, 2004 || Kitt Peak || Spacewatch ||  || align=right | 2.2 km || 
|-id=934 bgcolor=#E9E9E9
| 502934 ||  || — || March 31, 2011 || Haleakala || Pan-STARRS ||  || align=right | 1.1 km || 
|-id=935 bgcolor=#E9E9E9
| 502935 ||  || — || February 27, 2006 || Kitt Peak || Spacewatch || HOF || align=right | 2.0 km || 
|-id=936 bgcolor=#d6d6d6
| 502936 ||  || — || February 16, 2010 || Mount Lemmon || Mount Lemmon Survey ||  || align=right | 2.5 km || 
|-id=937 bgcolor=#E9E9E9
| 502937 ||  || — || March 11, 2007 || Kitt Peak || Spacewatch ||  || align=right data-sort-value="0.99" | 990 m || 
|-id=938 bgcolor=#d6d6d6
| 502938 ||  || — || January 17, 2004 || Kitt Peak || Spacewatch ||  || align=right | 2.4 km || 
|-id=939 bgcolor=#E9E9E9
| 502939 ||  || — || March 27, 2011 || Kitt Peak || Spacewatch ||  || align=right | 1.5 km || 
|-id=940 bgcolor=#d6d6d6
| 502940 ||  || — || February 19, 2010 || Mount Lemmon || Mount Lemmon Survey ||  || align=right | 1.9 km || 
|-id=941 bgcolor=#E9E9E9
| 502941 ||  || — || January 27, 2006 || Mount Lemmon || Mount Lemmon Survey ||  || align=right | 1.7 km || 
|-id=942 bgcolor=#E9E9E9
| 502942 ||  || — || August 15, 2013 || Haleakala || Pan-STARRS ||  || align=right data-sort-value="0.87" | 870 m || 
|-id=943 bgcolor=#d6d6d6
| 502943 ||  || — || October 19, 2007 || Kitt Peak || Spacewatch ||  || align=right | 2.8 km || 
|-id=944 bgcolor=#d6d6d6
| 502944 ||  || — || February 18, 2004 || Kitt Peak || Spacewatch ||  || align=right | 3.4 km || 
|-id=945 bgcolor=#d6d6d6
| 502945 ||  || — || February 17, 2010 || Kitt Peak || Spacewatch || EOS || align=right | 2.7 km || 
|-id=946 bgcolor=#d6d6d6
| 502946 ||  || — || April 21, 1998 || Socorro || LINEAR || EUP || align=right | 4.2 km || 
|-id=947 bgcolor=#d6d6d6
| 502947 ||  || — || November 23, 2003 || Kitt Peak || Spacewatch ||  || align=right | 4.3 km || 
|-id=948 bgcolor=#d6d6d6
| 502948 ||  || — || April 30, 2004 || Kitt Peak || Spacewatch ||  || align=right | 4.7 km || 
|-id=949 bgcolor=#E9E9E9
| 502949 ||  || — || January 22, 2006 || Mount Lemmon || Mount Lemmon Survey ||  || align=right | 2.9 km || 
|-id=950 bgcolor=#E9E9E9
| 502950 ||  || — || November 10, 2009 || Mount Lemmon || Mount Lemmon Survey ||  || align=right | 1.3 km || 
|-id=951 bgcolor=#E9E9E9
| 502951 ||  || — || February 22, 2006 || Mount Lemmon || Mount Lemmon Survey ||  || align=right | 2.4 km || 
|-id=952 bgcolor=#E9E9E9
| 502952 ||  || — || February 1, 2006 || Kitt Peak || Spacewatch ||  || align=right | 2.5 km || 
|-id=953 bgcolor=#E9E9E9
| 502953 ||  || — || March 3, 2006 || Catalina || CSS || DOR || align=right | 3.4 km || 
|-id=954 bgcolor=#E9E9E9
| 502954 ||  || — || October 3, 2003 || Kitt Peak || Spacewatch ||  || align=right | 3.0 km || 
|-id=955 bgcolor=#E9E9E9
| 502955 ||  || — || April 30, 2006 || Kitt Peak || Spacewatch || DOR || align=right | 1.9 km || 
|-id=956 bgcolor=#d6d6d6
| 502956 ||  || — || January 19, 2004 || Kitt Peak || Spacewatch || THM || align=right | 2.5 km || 
|-id=957 bgcolor=#E9E9E9
| 502957 ||  || — || October 3, 2008 || Mount Lemmon || Mount Lemmon Survey || HOF || align=right | 3.0 km || 
|-id=958 bgcolor=#d6d6d6
| 502958 ||  || — || January 29, 2010 || WISE || WISE ||  || align=right | 4.1 km || 
|-id=959 bgcolor=#E9E9E9
| 502959 ||  || — || February 27, 2006 || Kitt Peak || Spacewatch || WIT || align=right | 2.2 km || 
|-id=960 bgcolor=#E9E9E9
| 502960 ||  || — || December 13, 2004 || Kitt Peak || Spacewatch || AGN || align=right | 1.7 km || 
|-id=961 bgcolor=#fefefe
| 502961 ||  || — || January 14, 2011 || Kitt Peak || Spacewatch ||  || align=right data-sort-value="0.77" | 770 m || 
|-id=962 bgcolor=#E9E9E9
| 502962 ||  || — || October 4, 2004 || Kitt Peak || Spacewatch ||  || align=right | 1.4 km || 
|-id=963 bgcolor=#d6d6d6
| 502963 ||  || — || September 10, 2007 || Mount Lemmon || Mount Lemmon Survey ||  || align=right | 2.1 km || 
|-id=964 bgcolor=#E9E9E9
| 502964 ||  || — || January 13, 2010 || Mount Lemmon || Mount Lemmon Survey ||  || align=right | 3.0 km || 
|-id=965 bgcolor=#d6d6d6
| 502965 ||  || — || May 7, 2005 || Mount Lemmon || Mount Lemmon Survey ||  || align=right | 2.6 km || 
|-id=966 bgcolor=#E9E9E9
| 502966 ||  || — || October 2, 2008 || Mount Lemmon || Mount Lemmon Survey ||  || align=right | 2.2 km || 
|-id=967 bgcolor=#E9E9E9
| 502967 ||  || — || August 10, 2008 || La Sagra || OAM Obs. ||  || align=right | 1.8 km || 
|-id=968 bgcolor=#fefefe
| 502968 ||  || — || September 30, 2003 || Kitt Peak || Spacewatch ||  || align=right data-sort-value="0.51" | 510 m || 
|-id=969 bgcolor=#E9E9E9
| 502969 ||  || — || December 14, 2004 || Kitt Peak || Spacewatch ||  || align=right | 2.4 km || 
|-id=970 bgcolor=#d6d6d6
| 502970 ||  || — || January 31, 2009 || Mount Lemmon || Mount Lemmon Survey ||  || align=right | 3.3 km || 
|-id=971 bgcolor=#d6d6d6
| 502971 ||  || — || April 22, 1996 || Kitt Peak || Spacewatch ||  || align=right | 3.9 km || 
|-id=972 bgcolor=#d6d6d6
| 502972 ||  || — || February 28, 2009 || Kitt Peak || Spacewatch || EOS || align=right | 2.6 km || 
|-id=973 bgcolor=#E9E9E9
| 502973 ||  || — || March 3, 2006 || Kitt Peak || Spacewatch ||  || align=right | 1.5 km || 
|-id=974 bgcolor=#d6d6d6
| 502974 ||  || — || September 27, 2005 || Kitt Peak || Spacewatch || 7:4 || align=right | 3.5 km || 
|-id=975 bgcolor=#d6d6d6
| 502975 ||  || — || October 17, 2006 || Kitt Peak || Spacewatch || VER || align=right | 3.4 km || 
|-id=976 bgcolor=#d6d6d6
| 502976 ||  || — || September 27, 2006 || Mount Lemmon || Mount Lemmon Survey ||  || align=right | 2.9 km || 
|-id=977 bgcolor=#d6d6d6
| 502977 ||  || — || January 14, 2010 || WISE || WISE ||  || align=right | 4.8 km || 
|-id=978 bgcolor=#E9E9E9
| 502978 ||  || — || September 6, 2008 || Kitt Peak || Spacewatch || HNS || align=right | 2.5 km || 
|-id=979 bgcolor=#E9E9E9
| 502979 ||  || — || September 26, 2008 || Mount Lemmon || Mount Lemmon Survey ||  || align=right | 2.0 km || 
|-id=980 bgcolor=#d6d6d6
| 502980 ||  || — || November 7, 2007 || Mount Lemmon || Mount Lemmon Survey ||  || align=right | 2.7 km || 
|-id=981 bgcolor=#d6d6d6
| 502981 ||  || — || October 31, 2013 || Kitt Peak || Spacewatch ||  || align=right | 3.5 km || 
|-id=982 bgcolor=#d6d6d6
| 502982 ||  || — || November 13, 2007 || Kitt Peak || Spacewatch ||  || align=right | 2.6 km || 
|-id=983 bgcolor=#d6d6d6
| 502983 ||  || — || February 4, 2009 || Mount Lemmon || Mount Lemmon Survey ||  || align=right | 2.9 km || 
|-id=984 bgcolor=#E9E9E9
| 502984 ||  || — || February 22, 2006 || Catalina || CSS || IAN || align=right | 1.2 km || 
|-id=985 bgcolor=#d6d6d6
| 502985 ||  || — || October 8, 2012 || Mount Lemmon || Mount Lemmon Survey ||  || align=right | 2.1 km || 
|-id=986 bgcolor=#E9E9E9
| 502986 ||  || — || November 6, 2008 || Mount Lemmon || Mount Lemmon Survey || MRX || align=right | 2.1 km || 
|-id=987 bgcolor=#E9E9E9
| 502987 ||  || — || March 13, 2010 || Catalina || CSS || DOR || align=right | 1.7 km || 
|-id=988 bgcolor=#d6d6d6
| 502988 ||  || — || October 19, 2006 || Mount Lemmon || Mount Lemmon Survey ||  || align=right | 3.4 km || 
|-id=989 bgcolor=#d6d6d6
| 502989 ||  || — || March 27, 2009 || Mount Lemmon || Mount Lemmon Survey ||  || align=right | 3.3 km || 
|-id=990 bgcolor=#d6d6d6
| 502990 ||  || — || September 15, 2012 || Mount Lemmon || Mount Lemmon Survey ||  || align=right | 2.5 km || 
|-id=991 bgcolor=#E9E9E9
| 502991 ||  || — || May 2, 2010 || WISE || WISE ||  || align=right | 2.1 km || 
|-id=992 bgcolor=#d6d6d6
| 502992 ||  || — || December 3, 2013 || Haleakala || Pan-STARRS || EOS || align=right | 2.2 km || 
|-id=993 bgcolor=#d6d6d6
| 502993 ||  || — || August 28, 2006 || Kitt Peak || Spacewatch ||  || align=right | 2.8 km || 
|-id=994 bgcolor=#E9E9E9
| 502994 ||  || — || July 30, 2008 || Kitt Peak || Spacewatch ||  || align=right | 2.5 km || 
|-id=995 bgcolor=#d6d6d6
| 502995 ||  || — || December 4, 2008 || Mount Lemmon || Mount Lemmon Survey ||  || align=right | 3.4 km || 
|-id=996 bgcolor=#d6d6d6
| 502996 ||  || — || November 2, 2007 || Kitt Peak || Spacewatch || VER || align=right | 2.7 km || 
|-id=997 bgcolor=#E9E9E9
| 502997 ||  || — || September 11, 2004 || Socorro || LINEAR ||  || align=right | 1.8 km || 
|-id=998 bgcolor=#d6d6d6
| 502998 ||  || — || April 10, 2010 || Kitt Peak || Spacewatch ||  || align=right | 2.6 km || 
|-id=999 bgcolor=#d6d6d6
| 502999 ||  || — || October 4, 1996 || Kitt Peak || Spacewatch ||  || align=right | 3.2 km || 
|-id=000 bgcolor=#d6d6d6
| 503000 ||  || — || February 18, 2009 || La Sagra || OAM Obs. ||  || align=right | 2.9 km || 
|}

References

External links 
 Discovery Circumstances: Numbered Minor Planets (500001)–(505000) (IAU Minor Planet Center)

0502